= Social complexity =

Conceptual framework

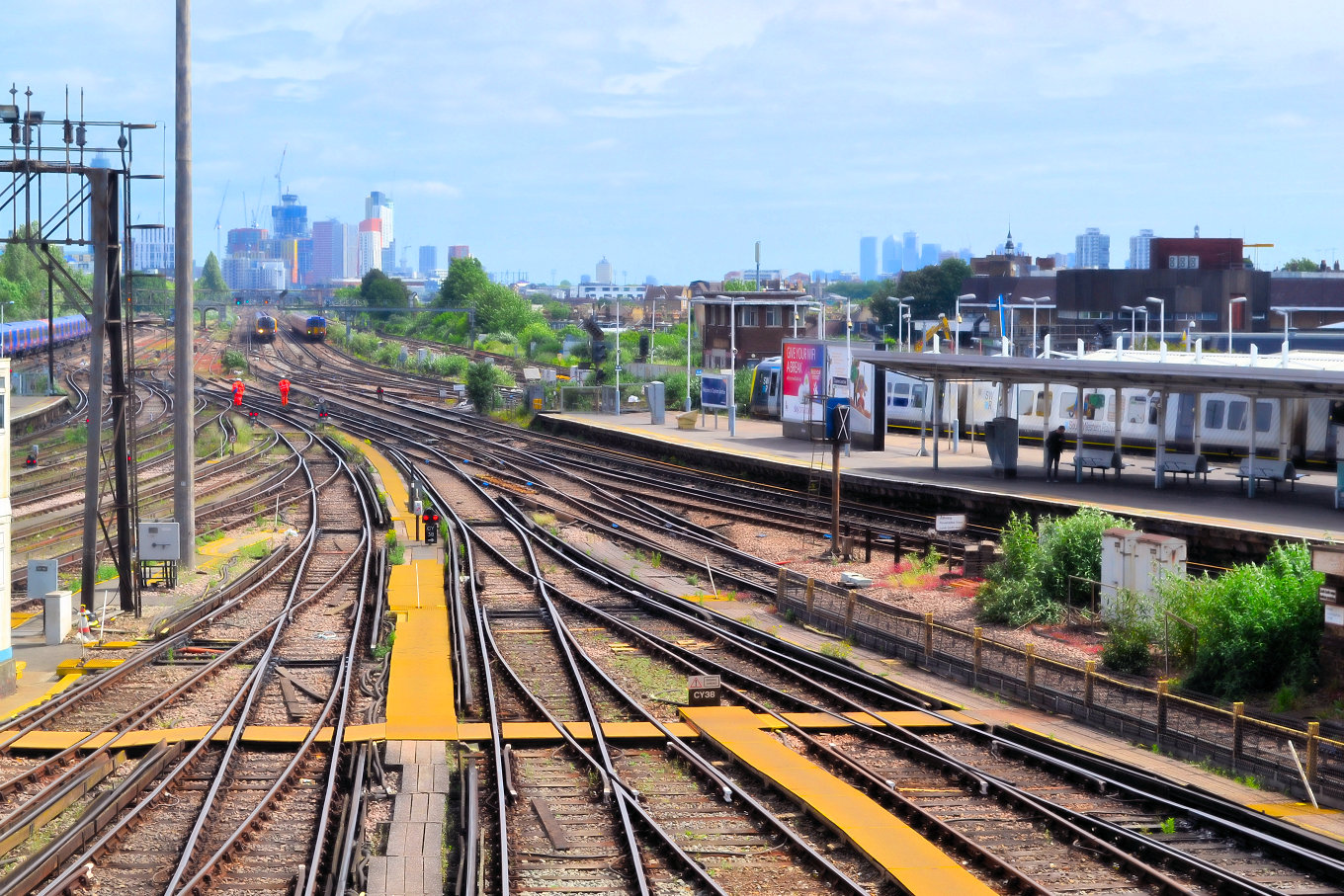
Social complexity: The infrastructure of train tracks through the Clapham Junction railway station, UK, is analogous to the complexity of the society served by the railroad.

In sociology, social complexity is a conceptual framework used in the analysis of society. In the sciences, contemporary definitions of complexity are found in systems theory, wherein the phenomenon being studied has many parts and many possible arrangements of the parts; simultaneously, what is complex and what is simple are relative and change in time.

Contemporary usage of the term complexity specifically refers to sociologic theories of society as a complex adaptive system, however, social complexity and its emergent properties are recurring subjects throughout the historical development of social philosophy and the study of social change.

Early theoreticians of sociology, such as Ferdinand Tönnies, Émile Durkheim, and Max Weber, Vilfredo Pareto and Georg Simmel, examined the exponential growth and interrelatedness of social encounters and social exchanges. The emphases on the interconnectivity among social relationships, and the emergence of new properties within society, is found in the social theory produced in the subfields of sociology. Social complexity is a basis for the connection of the phenomena reported in microsociology and macrosociology, and thus provides an intellectual middle-range for sociologists to formulate and develop hypotheses. Methodologically, social complexity is theory-neutral, and includes the phenomena studied in microsociology and the phenomena studied in macrosociology.

== Theoretic background ==
In 1937, the sociologist Talcott Parsons continued the work of the early theoreticians of sociology with his work on action theory; and by 1951, Parson had developed action theory into formal systems theory in The Social System (1951). In the following decades, the synergy between general systems thinking and the development of social system theories is carried forward by Robert K. Merton in discussions of theories of the middle-range and social structure and agency. From the late 1970s until the early 1990s, sociological investigation concerned the properties of systems in which the strong correlation of sub-parts leads to the observation of autopoetic, self-organizing, dynamical, turbulent, and chaotic behaviours that arise from mathematical complexity, such as the work of Niklas Luhmann.

One of the earliest usages of the term "complexity", in the social and behavioral sciences, to refer specifically to a complex system is found in the study of modern organizations and management studies. However, particularly in management studies, the term often has been used in a metaphorical rather than in a qualitative or quantitative theoretical manner. By the mid-1990s, the "complexity turn" in social sciences begins as some of the same tools generally used in complexity science are incorporated into the social sciences. By 1998, the international, electronic periodical, Journal of Artificial Societies and Social Simulation, had been created. In the last several years, many publications have presented overviews of complexity theory within the field of sociology. Within this body of work, connections also are drawn to yet other theoretical traditions, including constructivist epistemology and the philosophical positions of phenomenology, postmodernism and critical realism.

== Methodologies ==
Illustration of complexity (Penrose tiling fractal)

Methodologically, social complexity is theory-neutral, meaning that it accommodates both local and global approaches to sociological research. The very idea of social complexity arises out of the historical-comparative methods of early sociologists; obviously, this method is important in developing, defining, and refining the theoretical construct of social complexity. As complex social systems have many parts and there are many possible relationships between those parts, appropriate methodologies are typically determined to some degree by the research level of analysis differentiated by the researcher according to the level of description or explanation demanded by the research hypotheses.

At the most localized level of analysis, ethnographic, participant- or non-participant observation, content analysis and other qualitative research methods may be appropriate. More recently, highly sophisticated quantitative research methodologies are being developed and used in sociology at both local and global levels of analysis. Such methods include (but are not limited to) bifurcation diagrams, network analysis, non-linear modeling, and computational models including cellular automata programming, sociocybernetics and other methods of social simulation.

=== Complex social network analysis ===
Complex social network analysis is used to study the dynamics of large, complex social networks. Dynamic network analysis brings together traditional social network analysis, link analysis and multi-agent systems within network science and network theory. Through the use of key concepts and methods in social network analysis, agent-based modeling, theoretical physics, and modern mathematics (particularly graph theory and fractal geometry), this method of inquiry brought insights into the dynamics and structure of social systems. New computational methods of localized social network analysis are coming out of the work of Duncan Watts, Albert-László Barabási, Nicholas A. Christakis, Kathleen Carley and others.

New methods of global network analysis are emerging from the work of John Urry and the sociological study of globalization, linked to the work of Manuel Castells and the later work of Immanuel Wallerstein. Since the late 1990s, Wallerstein increasingly makes use of complexity theory, particularly the work of Ilya Prigogine. Dynamic social network analysis is linked to a variety of methodological traditions, above and beyond systems thinking, including graph theory, traditional social network analysis in sociology, and mathematical sociology. It also links to mathematical chaos and complex dynamics through the work of Duncan Watts and Steven Strogatz, as well as fractal geometry through Albert-László Barabási and his work on scale-free networks.

=== Computational sociology ===
The development of computational sociology involves such scholars as Nigel Gilbert, Klaus G. Troitzsch, Joshua M. Epstein, and others. The foci of methods in this field include social simulation and data-mining, both of which are sub-areas of computational sociology. Social simulation uses computers to create an artificial laboratory for the study of complex social systems; data-mining uses machine intelligence to search for non-trivial patterns of relations in large, complex, real-world databases. The emerging methods of socionics are a variant of computational sociology.

Computational sociology is influenced by a number of micro-sociological areas as well as the macro-level traditions of systems science and systems thinking. The micro-level influences of symbolic interaction, exchange, and rational choice, along with the micro-level focus of computational political scientists, such as Robert Axelrod, helped to develop computational sociology's bottom-up, agent-based approach to modeling complex systems. This is what Joshua M. Epstein calls generative science. Other important areas of influence include statistics, mathematical modeling and computer simulation.

=== Sociocybernetics ===
Sociocybernetics integrates sociology with second-order cybernetics and the work of Niklas Luhmann, along with the latest advances in complexity science. In terms of scholarly work, the focus of sociocybernetics has been primarily conceptual and only slightly methodological or empirical. Sociocybernetics is directly tied to systems thought inside and outside of sociology, specifically in the area of second-order cybernetics.

== Areas of application ==
In the first decade of the 21st century, the diversity of areas of application has grown as more sophisticated methods have developed. Social complexity theory is applied in studies of social cooperation and public goods; altruism; education; global civil society collective action and social movements; social inequality; workforce and unemployment; policy analysis; health care systems; and innovation and social change, to name a few. A current international scientific research project, the Seshat: Global History Databank, was explicitly designed to analyze changes in social complexity from the Neolithic Revolution until the Industrial Revolution.

As a middle-range theoretical platform, social complexity can be applied to any research in which social interaction or the outcomes of such interactions can be observed, but particularly where they can be measured and expressed as continuous or discrete data points. One common criticism often cited regarding the usefulness of complexity science in sociology is the difficulty of obtaining adequate data. Nonetheless, application of the concept of social complexity and the analysis of such complexity has begun and continues to be an ongoing field of inquiry in sociology. From childhood friendships and teen pregnancy to criminology and counter-terrorism, theories of social complexity are being applied in almost all areas of sociological research.

In the area of communications research and informetrics, the concept of self-organizing systems appears in mid-1990s research related to scientific communications. Scientometrics and bibliometrics are areas of research in which discrete data are available, as are several other areas of social communications research such as sociolinguistics. Social complexity is also a concept used in semiotics.

== See also ==
=== Social science ===
- Complex society – Concept in anthropology
- Complexity economics – Application of complexity science to economics
- Complexity theory and organizations – Application of complexity theory to strategy
- Differentiation (sociology) – Increase in subsystems within a modern society
- Econophysics – Application of physics to the study of economics
- Engaged theory – Comprehensive critical theory
- Network Analysis and Ethnographic Problems
- Personal information management – Tools and systems for managing one's own data

=== General ===
- Aggregate data – Data combined from several measurements
- Artificial neural network – Computational model used in machine learning, based on connected, hierarchical functions
- Cognitive complexity
- Computational complexity theory – Inherent difficulty of computational problems
- Dual-phase evolution – Process that drives self-organization within complex adaptive systems
- Evolutionary programming – Evolutionary algorithm with a defined structure
- Game theory – Mathematical models of strategic interactions
- Generic-case complexity
- Multi-agent system – Built of multiple interacting agents
- Systemography
