= William A. Wallace (organizational theorist) =

- Born: ca. 1935 (age 90–91)
- Citizenship: American
- Education: Illinois Institute of Technology 1958, Rensselaer Polytechnic Institute 1965
- Known for: Dynamic network analysis
- Scientific career
- Fields: Social network analysis Computational sociology
- Workplaces: Rensselaer Polytechnic Institute

William A. Wallace (often referred to as William "Al" Wallace) is an American systems and infrastructure engineering expert. He is professor at Rensselaer Polytechnic Institute in the department of decision sciences and engineering systems, and holds joint appointments in cognitive sciences and civil and environmental engineering. He is research director of Rensselaer's Center for Infrastructure and Transportation Studies.

== Education and early life ==
Wallace gained his bachelor's degree in chemical engineering from the Illinois Institute of Technology in 1958, and his M.S. (1961) and Ph.D. (1965) in management science from Rensselaer, His doctoral thesis was entitled Producer Learning: An Adaptive Control Process. He also served in the U.S. Navy.

== Research ==
Wallace's research interests center around decision support systems, the process of modeling and emergency management. His work has focussed on transportation, infrastructure and in particular computer-based simulation and modeling, notably of emergency transport and other major incident management.

Wallace was the founding co-editor, and co-editor-in-chief of the journal Computational and Mathematical Organization Theory.
