= Klaus G. Troitzsch =

German sociologist

- Born: Klaus Gerhard Troitzsch; 28 November 1946 (age 79)
- Education: University of Hamburg
- Known for: Agent-based models for the social sciences, social simulation
- Scientific career
- Fields: Agent-based modeling, Methods of Sociology, Social simulation
- Workplaces: Hamburg Parliament, University of Koblenz
- Doctoral advisor: Winfried Steffani
- Other academic advisors: Heino Kaack
- Notable students: Ottmar Edenhofer

Klaus G. Troitzsch (* 28. November 1946, in Ilsede-Oberg, Lower Saxony) is a German sociologist. He became famous for introducing the method of computer-based simulation in the social sciences. He was professor and director of the Institute for IS Research at University of Koblenz-Landau (as of 01/01/2023 University of Koblenz).

== Career ==
Klaus G. Troitzsch studied sociology and political science at the University of Hamburg and the University of Cologne. In the 1970s Troitzsch was active politician. He served for the German liberal party (FDP) in the parliament of Hamburg, from 1972 to 1974 as an assistant and later (from 1974 to 1978) as a member, and also as executive secretary. In 1979 he completed his PhD in political sciences at the University of Hamburg and returned to academia, first as a senior researcher at the University of Koblenz-Landau, and then, from 1986, as full professor. From 1987 to 1992 he served the faculty of computer science of the University of Koblenz-Landau as dean and from 1992 to 2000 as vice-dean. In 2001, he received an honorary doctorate from the Dnipropetrovsk National University (Ukraine). Troitzsch became professor emeritus in 2012.

== Work ==
Troitzsch is a pioneer in the methodological development of computer-based simulation in the social sciences, especially the method of agent-based modeling in the social sciences. In the field of computational social sciences, Troitzsch's focus lies on the one hand on agent-based modeling and on the other hand on microsimulation. He published one of the most important textbooks in that area "Simulation for the Social Scientist", now in its second edition (together with Nigel Gilbert). Further, he was among the founders of the Research Committee on Modelling and Simulation of the German Sociological Association and the SimSoc Consortium, which publishes the Journal of Artificial Societies and Social Simulation. he was the first Treasurer of the European Social Simulation Association. He has been involved in several research projects funded by the European Union, for instance Freshwater Integrated Resources Management with Agents (FIRMA) and OCOPOMO.

Troitzsch organized also several conferences in the social sciences, for instance the third annual conference of the European Social Simulation Association, (ESSA 2005), Epistemological Perspectives on Simulation (EPOS) in 2004, the 26th European Conference on Modelling and Simulation (ECMS) and, for twelve years, an annual summer school on social simulation (the Advanced Simulation Workshop/Zuma Workshop on Simulation for Social Scientists).
