= Shunyu Yao =

Chinese computer scientist

Shunyu Yao (Chinese: 姚顺雨; born 1998) is a computer scientist specializing in artificial intelligence. He currently serves as a Chief AI Scientist at Tencent.

== Education ==
Yao holds an undergraduate degree from the Institute for Interdisciplinary Information Sciences (IIIS) at Tsinghua University, commonly known as the "Yao Class." He subsequently earned his Ph.D. in computer science from Princeton University. During his undergraduate studies, he served as the president of the Yao Class Student Union.

== Career ==
Before joining Tencent, Yao worked at OpenAI, where he made significant contributions to the development of language-based agents that work with large language models. He left for Tencent in 2025.
