= Agent-based model in biology =

Modeling biology

Agent-based models have many applications in biology, primarily due to the characteristics of the modeling method. Agent-based modeling is a rule-based, computational modeling methodology that focuses on rules and interactions among the individual components or the agents of the matrix . The goal of this modeling method is to generate populations of the system components of interest and simulate their interactions in a virtual world. Agent-based models start with rules for behavior and seek to reconstruct, through computational instantiation of those behavioral rules, the observed patterns of behavior.

== Characteristics ==
Several of the characteristics of agent-based models important to biological studies include:

=== Modular structure ===
The behavior of an agent-based model is defined by the rules of its agents. Existing agent rules can be modified or new agents can be added without having to modify the entire model.

=== Emergent properties ===
Through the use of the individual agents that interact locally with rules of behavior, agent-based models result in a synergy that leads to a higher level whole with much more intricate behavior than those of each individual agent.

=== Abstraction ===
Either by excluding non-essential details or when details are not available, agent-based models can be constructed in the absence of complete knowledge of the system under study. This allows the model to be as simple and verifiable as possible.

=== Stochasticity ===
Biological systems exhibit behavior that appears to be random. The probability of a particular behavior can be determined for a system as a whole and then be translated into rules for the individual agents.

== Modelling different species behaviour ==
In an ecological context, agent-based modeling can be used to model the behaviour of different species such as insects infestations, other invasive species, aphids, aquatic populations, and the evolution of innate foraging behaviors.

=== Forest insect infestations ===
Agent-based modeling has been used to simulate attack behavior of the mountain pine beetle (MPB), Dendroctonus ponderosae, in order to evaluate how different harvesting policies influence spatial characteristics of the forest and spatial propagation of the MPB infestation over time. About two-thirds of the land in British Columbia, Canada is covered by forests that are constantly being modified by natural disturbances such as fire, disease, and insect infestation. Forest resources make up approximately 15% of the province's economy, so infestations caused by insects such as the MPB can have significant impacts on the economy. The MPB outbreaks are considered a major natural disturbance that can result in widespread mortality of the lodgepole pine tree, one of the most abundant commercial tree species in British Columbia. Insect outbreaks have resulted in the death of trees over areas of several thousand square kilometers.

The agent-based model developed for this study was designed to simulate the MPB attack behavior in order to evaluate how management practices influence the spatial distribution and patterns of insect population and their preferences for attacked and killed trees. Three management strategies were considered by the model: 1) no management, 2) sanitation harvest and 3) salvage harvest. In the model, the Beetle Agent represented the MPB behavior; the Pine Agent represented the forest environment and tree health evolution; the Forest Management Agent represented the different management strategies. The Beetle Agent follows a series of rules to decide where to fly within the forest and to select a healthy tree to attack, feed, and breed. The MPB typically kills host trees in its natural environment in order to successfully reproduce. The beetle larvae feed on the inner bark of mature host trees, eventually killing them. In order for the beetles to reproduce, the host tree must be sufficiently large and have thick inner bark. The MPB outbreaks end when the food supply decreases to the point that there is not enough to sustain the population or when climatic conditions become unfavorable for the beetle. The Pine Agent simulates the resistance of the host tree, specifically the Lodgepole pine tree, and monitors the state and attributes of each stand of trees. At some point in the MPB attack, the number of beetles per tree reaches the host tree capacity. When this point is reached, the beetles release a chemical to direct beetles to attack other trees. The Pine Agent models this behavior by calculating the beetle population density per stand and passes the information to the Beetle Agents. The Forest Management Agent was used, at the stand level, to simulate two common silviculture practices (sanitation and salvage) as well as the strategy where no management practice was employed. With the sanitation harvest strategy, if a stand has an infestation rate greater than a set threshold, the stand is removed as well as any healthy neighbor stand when the average size of the trees exceeded a set threshold. For the salvage harvest strategy, a stand is removed even it is not under a MPB attack if a predetermined number of neighboring stands are under a MPB attack.

The study considered a forested area in the North-Central Interior of British Columbia of approximately 560 hectare. The area consisted primarily of Lodgepole pine with smaller proportions of Douglas fir and White spruce. The model was executed for five time steps, each step representing a single year. Thirty simulation runs were conducted for each forest management strategy considered. The results of the simulation showed that when no management strategy was employed, the highest overall MPB infestation occurred. The results also showed that the salvage harvest management technique resulted in a 25% reduction in the number of forest strands killed by the MPB, as opposed to a 19% reduction by the sanitation harvest management strategy. In summary, the results show that the model can be used as a tool to build forest management policies.

=== Invasive species ===
Invasive species refers to "non-native" plants and animals that adversely affect the environments they invade. The introduction of invasive species may have environmental, economic, and ecological implications. An agent-based model can developed to evaluate the impacts of port-specific and importer-specific enforcement regimes for a given agricultural commodity that presents invasive species risk with the goal of improving the allocation of enforcement resources and to provide a tool to policy makers to answer further questions concerning border enforcement and invasive species risk.

The agent-based model developed for the study considered three types of agents: invasive species, importers, and border enforcement agents. In the model, the invasive species can only react to their surroundings, while the importers and border enforcement agents are able to make their own decisions based on their own goals and objectives. The invasive species has the ability to determine if it has been released in an area containing the target crop, and to spread to adjacent plots of the target crop. The model incorporates spatial probability maps that are used to determine if an invasive species becomes established. The study focused on shipments of broccoli from Mexico into California through the ports of entry Calexico, California and Otay Mesa, California. The selected invasive species of concern was the crucifer flea beetle (Phyllotreta cruciferae). California is by far the largest producer of broccoli in the United States and so the concern and potential impact of an invasive species introduction through the chosen ports of entry is significant. The model also incorporated a spatially explicit damage function that was used to model invasive species damage in a realistic manner. Agent-based modeling provides the ability to analyze the behavior of heterogeneous actors, so three different types of importers were considered that differed in terms of commodity infection rates (high, medium, and low), pretreatment choice, and cost of transportation to the ports. The model gave predictions on inspection rates for each port of entry and importer and determined the success rate of border agent inspection, not only for each port and importer but also for each potential level of pretreatment (no pretreatment, level one, level two, and level three).

The model was implemented and ran in NetLogo, version 3.1.5. Spatial information on the location of the ports of entry, major highways, and transportation routes was included in the analysis as well as a map of California broccoli crops layered with invasive species establishment probability maps. BehaviorSpace, a software tool integrated with NetLogo, was used to test the effects of different parameters (e.g. shipment value, pretreatment cost) in the model. On average, 100 iterations were calculated at each level of the parameter being used, where an iteration represented a one-year run.

The results of the model showed that as inspection efforts increase, importers increase due care, or the pretreatment of shipments, and the total monetary loss of California crops decreases. The model showed that importers respond to an increase in inspection effort in different ways. Some importers responded to increased inspection rate by increasing pretreatment effort, while others chose to avoid shipping to a specific port, or shopped for another port. An important result of the model results is that it can show or provide recommendations to policy makers about the point at which importers may start to shop for ports, such as the inspection rate at which port shopping is introduced and the importers associated with a certain level of pest risk or transportation cost are likely to make these changes. Another interesting outcome of the model is that when inspectors were not able to learn to respond to an importer with previously infested shipments, damage to California broccoli crops was estimated to be $150 million. However, when inspectors were able to increase inspection rates of importers with previous violations, damage to the California broccoli crops was reduced by approximately 12%. The model provides a mechanism to predict the introduction of invasive species from agricultural imports and their likely damage. Equally as important, the model provides policy makers and border control agencies with a tool that can be used to determine the best allocation of inspectional resources.

=== Aphid population dynamics ===
An agent-based model can be used to study the population dynamics of the bird cherry-oat aphid, Rhopalosiphum padi. The study was conducted in a five square kilometer region of North Yorkshire, a county located in the Yorkshire and the Humber region of England. The agent-based modeling method was chosen because of its focus on the behavior of the individual agents rather than the population as a whole. The authors propose that traditional models that focus on populations as a whole do not take into account the complexity of the concurrent interactions in ecosystems, such as reproduction and competition for resources which may have significant impacts on population trends. The agent-based modeling approach also allows modelers to create more generic and modular models that are more flexible and easier to maintain than modeling approaches that focus on the population as a whole. Other proposed advantages of agent-based models include realistic representation of a phenomenon of interest due to the interactions of a group of autonomous agents, and the capability to integrate quantitative variables, differential equations, and rule based behavior into the same model.

The model was implemented in the modeling toolkit Repast using the JAVA programming language. The model was run in daily time steps and focused on the autumn and winter seasons. Input data for the model included habitat data, daily minimum, maximum, and mean temperatures, and wind speed and direction. For the Aphid agents, age, position, and morphology (alate or apterous) were considered. Age ranged from 0.00 to 2.00, with 1.00 being the point at which the agent becomes an adult. Reproduction by the Aphid agents is dependent on age, morphology, and daily minimum, maximum, and mean temperatures. Once nymphs hatch, they remain in the same location as their parents. The morphology of the nymphs is related to population density and the nutrient quality of the aphid's food source. The model also considered mortality among the Aphid agents, which is dependent on age, temperatures, and quality of habitat. The speed at which an Aphid agent ages is determined by the daily minimum, maximum, and mean temperatures. The model considered movement of the Aphid agents to occur in two separate phases, a migratory phase and a foraging phase, both of which affect the overall population distribution.

The study started the simulation run with an initial population of 10,000 alate aphids distributed across a grid of 25 meter cells. The simulation results showed that there were two major population peaks, the first in early autumn due to an influx of alate immigrants and the second due to lower temperatures later in the year and a lack of immigrants. Ultimately, it is the goal of the researchers to adapt this model to simulate broader ecosystems and animal types.

=== Aquatic population dynamics ===
A model is proposed to study the population dynamics of two species of macrophytes. Aquatic plants play a vital role in the ecosystems in which they live as they may provide shelter and food for other aquatic organisms. However, they may also have harmful impacts such as the excessive growth of non-native plants or eutrophication of the lakes in which they live leading to anoxic conditions. Given these possibilities, it is important to understand how the environment and other organisms affect the growth of these aquatic plants to allow mitigation or prevention of these harmful impacts.

Potamogeton pectinatus is one of the aquatic plant agents in the model. It is an annual growth plant that absorbs nutrients from the soil and reproduces through root tubers and rhizomes. Reproduction of the plant is not impacted by water flow, but can be influenced by animals, other plants, and humans. The plant can grow up to two meters tall, which is a limiting condition because it can only grow in certain water depths, and most of its biomass is found at the top of the plant in order to capture the most sunlight possible. The second plant agent in the model is Chara aspera, also a rooted aquatic plant. One major difference in the two plants is that the latter reproduces through the use of very small seeds called oospores and bulbils which are spread via the flow of water. Chara aspera only grows up to 20 cm and requires very good light conditions as well as good water quality, all of which are limiting factors on the growth of the plant. Chara aspera has a higher growth rate than Potamogeton pectinatus but has a much shorter life span. The model also considered environmental and animal agents. Environmental agents considered included water flow, light penetration, and water depth. Flow conditions, although not of high importance to Potamogeton pectinatus, directly impact the seed dispersal of Chara aspera. Flow conditions affect the direction as well as the distance the seeds will be distributed. Light penetration strongly influences Chara aspera as it requires high water quality. Extinction coefficient (EC) is a measure of light penetration in water. As EC increases, the growth rate of Chara aspera decreases. Finally, depth is important to both species of plants. As water depth increases, the light penetration decreases making it difficult for either species to survive beyond certain depths.

The area of interest in the model was a lake in the Netherlands named Lake Veluwe. It is a relatively shallow lake with an average depth of 1.55 meters and covers about 30 square kilometers. The lake is under eutrophication stress which means that nutrients are not a limiting factor for either of the plant agents in the model. The initial position of the plant agents in the model was randomly determined. The model was implemented using Repast software package and was executed to simulate the growth and decay of the two different plant agents, taking into account the environmental agents previously discussed as well as interactions with other plant agents. The results of the model execution show that the population distribution of Chara aspera has a spatial pattern very similar to the GIS maps of observed distributions. The authors of the study conclude that the agent rules developed in the study are reasonable to simulate the spatial pattern of macrophyte growth in this particular lake.

== Cell-based modeling ==
Agent-based modeling is increasingly used to model the behaviour of individual cells within a tissue. These models are divided into on- and off-lattice models with on-lattice models such as cellular automata and cellular potts model and off-lattice models such as center-based models, vertex-based models, immersed boundary method models and models based on the subcellular element method. Some examples of specific applications of cell-based modeling are:

=== Bacteria aggregation leading to biofilm formation ===
An agent-based model can be used model the colonisation of bacteria onto a surface, leading to the formation of biofilms. The purpose of iDynoMiCS (individual-based Dynamics of Microbial Communities Simulator) is to simulate the growth of populations and communities of individual microbes (small unicellular organisms such as bacteria, archaea and protists) that compete for space and resources in biofilms immersed in aquatic environments. iDynoMiCS can be used to seek to understand how individual microbial dynamics lead to emergent population- or biofilm-level properties and behaviours. Examining such formations is important in soil and river studies, dental hygiene studies, infectious disease and medical implant related infection research, and for understanding biocorrosion. An agent-based modelling paradigm was employed to make it possible to explore how each individual bacterium, of a particular species, contributes to the development of the biofilm. The initial illustration of iDynoMiCS considered how environmentally fluctuating oxygen availability affects the diversity and composition of a community of denitrifying bacteria that induce the denitrification pathway under anoxic or low oxygen conditions. The study explores the hypothesis that the existence of diverse strategies of denitrification in an environment can be explained by solely assuming that faster response incurs a higher cost. The agent-based model suggests that if metabolic pathways can be switched without cost the faster the switching the better. However, where faster switching incurs a higher cost, there is a strategy with optimal response time for any frequency of environmental fluctuations. This suggests that different types of denitrifying strategies win in different biological environments. Since this introduction the applications of iDynoMiCS continues to increase: a recent exploration of the plasmid invasion in biofilms being one example. This study explored the hypothesis that poor plasmid spread in biofilms is caused by a dependence of conjugation on the growth rate of the plasmid donor agent. Through simulation, the paper suggests that plasmid invasion into a resident biofilm is only limited when plasmid transfer depends on growth. Sensitivity analysis techniques were employed that suggests parameters relating to timing (lag before plasmid transfer between agents) and spatial reach are more important for plasmid invasion into a biofilm than the receiving agents growth rate or probability of segregational loss. Further examples that use iDynoMiCS continue to be published, including use of iDynoMiCS in modelling of a Pseudomonas aeruginosa biofilm with glucose substrate.

iDynoMiCS has been developed by an international team of researchers in order to provide a common platform for further development of all individual-based models of microbial biofilms and such like. The model was originally the result of years of work by Laurent Lardon, Brian Merkey, and Jan-Ulrich Kreft, with code contributions from Joao Xavier. With additional funding from the National Centre for Replacement, Refinement, and Reduction of Animals in Research (NC3Rs) in 2013, the development of iDynoMiCS as a tool for biological exploration continues apace, with new features being added when appropriate. From its inception, the team have committed to releasing iDynoMiCS as an open source platform, encouraging collaborators to develop additional functionality that can then be merged into the next stable release. IDynoMiCS has been implemented in the Java programming language, with MATLAB and R scripts provided to analyse results. Biofilm structures that are formed in simulation can be viewed as a movie using POV-Ray files that are generated as the simulation is run.

=== Mammary stem cell enrichment following irradiation during puberty ===
Experiments have shown that exposure to ionizing irradiation of pubertal mammary glands results in an increase in the ratio of mammary stem cells in the gland. This is important because stem cells are thought to be key targets for cancer initiation by ionizing radiation because they have the greatest long-term proliferative potential and mutagenic events persist in multiple daughter cells. Additionally, epidemiology data show that children exposed to ionizing radiation have a substantially greater breast cancer risk than adults. These experiments thus prompted questions about the underlying mechanism for the increase in mammary stem cells following radiation which can be explored by two agent-based models used in parallel with in vivo and in vitro experiments to evaluate cell inactivation, dedifferentiation via epithelial-mesenchymal transition (EMT), and self-renewal (symmetric division) as mechanisms by which radiation could increase stem cells.

The first agent-based model is a multiscale model of mammary gland development starting with a rudimentary mammary ductal tree at the onset of puberty (during active proliferation) all the way to a full mammary gland at adulthood (when there is little proliferation). The model consists of millions of agents, with each agent representing a mammary stem cell, a progenitor cell, or a differentiated cell in the breast. Simulations were first run on the Lawrence Berkeley National Laboratory Lawrencium supercomputer to parameterize and benchmark the model against a variety of in vivo mammary gland measurements. The model was then used to test the three different mechanisms to determine which one led to simulation results that matched in vivo experiments the best. Surprisingly, radiation-induced cell inactivation by death did not contribute to increased stem cell frequency independently of the dose delivered in the model. Instead the model revealed that the combination of increased self-renewal and cell proliferation during puberty led to stem cell enrichment. In contrast epithelial-mesenchymal transition in the model was shown to increase stem cell frequency not only in pubertal mammary glands but also in adult glands. This latter prediction, however, contradicted the in vivo data; irradiation of adult mammary glands did not lead to increased stem cell frequency. These simulations therefore suggested self-renewal as the primary mechanism behind pubertal stem cell increase.

To further evaluate self-renewal as the mechanism, a second agent-based model was created to simulate the growth dynamics of human mammary epithelial cells (containing stem/progenitor and differentiated cell subpopulations) in vitro after irradiation. By comparing the simulation results with data from the in vitro experiments, the second agent-based model further confirmed that cells must extensively proliferate to observe a self-renewal dependent increase in stem/progenitor cell numbers after irradiation.

The combination of the two agent-based models and the in vitro/in vivo experiments provide insight into why children exposed to ionizing radiation have a substantially greater breast cancer risk than adults. Together, they support the hypothesis that the breast is susceptible to a transient increase in stem cell self-renewal when exposed to radiation during puberty, which primes the adult tissue to develop cancer decades later.

== See also ==
- Autonomous agent – Type of autonomous entity in software
- Intelligent agent – Software agent which acts autonomously
