= Comparison of agent-based modeling software =

The agent-based modeling (ABM) community has developed several practical agent based modeling toolkits that enable individuals to develop agent-based applications. More and more such toolkits are coming into existence, and each toolkit has a variety of characteristics. Several individuals have made attempts to compare toolkits to each other (e.g.). Below is a chart providing an overview of platforms that have their own Wikipedia page and is intended to capture many of the features that are important to ABM toolkit users.

== Comparison of ABM software ==
Agent Based Modeling Toolkit Comparison
Platform	Supporting Organization	License	Programming Language	Operating System	GIS Capabilities	3D Capabilities	Last Update
Adaptive Modeler	Altreva; Utrecht, Netherlands	Proprietary; free evaluation version available for research and experimentation (some limitations but no expiration)	No programming skills required. An adaptive form of genetic programming is used to create trading rules. Users can select functions to be used in the genetic programming engine.	Windows	Unknown	Yes Up to 3 agent properties can be visualized in real-time using 2D graphics and color	July 20, 2020 (Version 1.6.0)
AnyLogic	The AnyLogic Company; Oakbrook Terrace, Illinois, USA	Proprietary; Free Personal Learning Edition available	Java	Linux, macOS, Windows	Yes: supports both tile maps from free online providers and shapefile-based maps	Yes	November 20, 2024
Framsticks	Poznan University of Technology, Poznan, Poland	Depends on module: GPL/LGPL/Proprietary	FramScript (similar to JavaScript)	Cross-platform	Yes	Yes	June 23, 2025 (version 5.3)
GAMA Platform	IRD/SU international research unit UMMISCO, France	GNU GPL v3.0	GAML (GAma Modeling Language) for simulations, Java for extensions	Windows; Linux; *nix; Mac OS X	Yes	Yes	July 3, 2025; 16 months ago (version 2025.06.4)
MASON	George Mason University, Fairfax, Virginia, USA	Open source (Academic Free License)	Java	Cross-platform	Yes	Yes	September 3, 2019 (Version 20)
NetLogo	Northwestern University, Evanston, Illinois, USA	GNU GPL	NetLogo	Cross-platform	Yes	Yes	May 1, 2026 (Version 7.0.4)
Repast	Argonne National Laboratory, University of Chicago; Lemont, Illinois, USA	BSD	Java (RepastS, RepastJ); Python (Repast4Py); Visual Basic, .Net, C++, J#, C# (Repast.net)	Cross-platform	Yes	Yes	July 2, 2024 (Version 2.11.0)
Soar	John E. Laird, Clare Bates Congdon, Mazin Assanie, Nate Derbinsky and Joseph Xu; Division of Computer Science and Engineering, University of Michigan, Ann Arbor, Michigan, USA	BSD	Soar 1 to 5 in Lisp; Soar 6 in C; Java, C++, TCL	Cross-platform	Unknown	Unknown	July 28, 2017 (Version 9.6.0)
StarLogo	Mitchel Resnick, Eric Klopfer, and others at MIT Media Lab and The MIT Scheller Teacher Education Program, Massachusetts Institute of Technology; Cambridge, MA, USA	Free (closed source) – Clearthought Software License, Version 1.0	StarLogo (an extension of Logo)	Cross-platform	Unknown	Unknown	November 27, 2018
Swarm	Swarm Development Group	GNU GPL	Java; Objective-C	Cross-platform	Unknown	Unknown	2005
