= Nigel Gilbert =

British sociologist (born 1950)

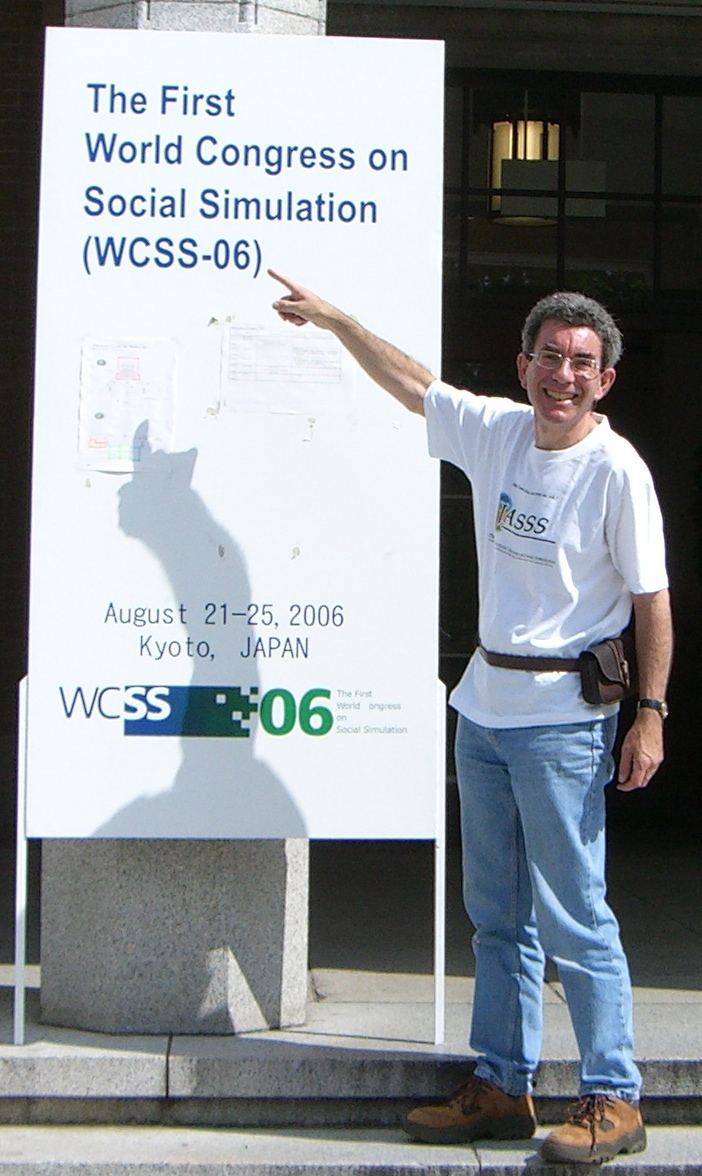
- Born: Geoffrey Nigel Gilbert; 21 March 1950 (age 76); Birmingham, United Kingdom
- Education: University of Cambridge
- Known for: Agent-based models for the social sciences, Social simulation
- Awards: CBE ScD(Cantab), FBCS, FRSA, FAcSS, FREng
- Scientific career
- Fields: Computational sociology, Complexity theory, Sociology of science, Evaluation of public policy
- Workplaces: University of Surrey
- Thesis: The development of science and scientific knowledge (1976)
- Doctoral advisor: Michael Mulkay

Geoffrey Nigel Gilbert (born 21 March 1950) is a British sociologist and a pioneer in the use of agent-based models in the social sciences. He is the founder and director of the Centre for Research in Social Simulation (University of Surrey), author of several books on computational social science, social simulation and social research and past editor of the Journal of Artificial Societies and Social Simulation (JASSS), the leading journal in the field.

== Career ==
A Cambridge engineering graduate (Emmanuel College), he turned to the sociology of scientific knowledge for his PhD under the direction of Michael Mulkay. He was a lecturer at the University of York (1974–76) and then joined the University of Surrey where he became a professor in the Department of Sociology in 1991. At the University of Surrey he founded the Social and Computer Sciences research group in 1984 with a grant from the Alvey Programme. The group focused on applying social science to the design of intelligent knowledge-based systems. Later he established the Centre for Research in Social Simulation (1997), and the Digital World Research Centre (1998). He served as a Pro-Vice-Chancellor of the University of Surrey (1998–2005) and he is the current Director of its Institute of Advanced Studies. He served as a member of the Council of the Economic and Social Research Council. from 2017 to 2020.

== Work ==
=== Sociology of scientific knowledge ===
Gilbert and Mulkay (1984) is a key contribution on the use of discourse analysis methods in the sociology of scientific knowledge. By applying discourse analysis to extensive qualitative data on a scientific dispute in the field of chemistry, Gilbert and Mulkay account for the social processes that underpin knowledge production, especially when consensus has not yet been established within the scientific community.

=== Secondary analysis of large government datasets ===
With Sara Arber, he was a pioneer in the use for academic analysis of computer files of survey data collected by the Office of Population Censuses and Surveys, a data source that has now become commonplace in sociology.

=== Access to social security information ===
The regulations determining what claimants of UK welfare benefits are entitled to (e.g. income support, tax credits, Disability Living Allowance) are complicated and often very difficult for claimants to apprehend unaided. With the growing availability of personal computers in the 1980s, he realised that an interactive program, designed for claimants themselves to use, could be helpful. He developed a prototype, which was taken up by both the then Department of Health and Social Security and Citizens Advice Bureaux, and which was the forerunner of the systems nowadays routinely used in advice centres. This work also contributed to understanding the interface requirements for publicly accessible computer systems, using graphical interfaces and, later, speech dialogue interfaces .

=== Social simulation ===
Nigel Gilbert is one of the founders of modern computational sociology, a discipline that merges social science research with simulation techniques with the goal of modelling complex policy issues and fundamental aspects of human societies. His first work in this area was a project on modelling the emergence of organised society in prehistoric France, with Jim Doran . While this was only moderately successful, it led him to organise in 1992 the first of an influential series of workshops on 'Simulating Societies’ Later he established:

- the SIMSOC mailing list. In January 2024 the list had 1331 subscribers.
- the Journal of Artificial Societies and Social Simulation (JASSS), which was launched in 1998 to provide a publication outlet for simulation-based research. Professor Gilbert was the editor until 2014. JASSS is an online no-fee Open Access journal.

In 1997, CRESS received funding from the FAIR programme of the European Commission for a project called IMAGES: Improving agri-environmental policies–a simulation approach to the role of the cognitive properties of farmers and institutions (1997–2000). This was the first of many Commission funded projects using social simulation to which he contributed, such as SEIN, FIRMA, SIMWEB, EMIL, NEMO, NEWTIES, PATRES, QLectives, ePolicy, TellMe, GLODERS and P2Pvalue .

In 1999, Nigel Gilbert and Klaus G. Troitzsch published Simulation for the social scientist, the first "how to" text book on social simulation and, in 2008, Agent-based Models, now one of the standard references on agent-based modelling.

=== Policy evaluation ===
In 2016, he became the Director of a newly established Centre for the Evaluation of Complexity Across the Nexus (CECAN). The centre, funded by the Economic and Social Research Council and the Natural Environment Research Council with the support of DECC, DEFRA, the Environment Agency and the Food Standards Agency, pioneers, tests and promotes innovative evaluation approaches and methods across nexus problem domains, such as biofuel production or climate change, where food, energy, water and environmental issues intersect. The Centre authored Handling Complexity in Policy Evaluation, a Supplementary Guide to the 2020 edition of HM Treasury's Magenta Book, its handbook on policy evaluation. He founded a spin-out company, CECAN Ltd. in 2019 to provide consultancy services to decision makers on innovative policy evaluation approaches.

=== Other research and advisory activity ===
In 1993, Gilbert founded the journal Sociological Research Online. This pioneered the use of the web as a medium for academic publication. He is founding editor of Social Research Update, a quarterly publication of the University of Surrey. He and Stuart Peters created a journal management system, epress, originally to make running Sociological Research Online and JASSS easier, but now available commercially.

Beside his research activity, he has served on a number of government and national committees: as the Deputy Chairman of the Manufacturing, Production and Business Processes Foresight Panel (1994–99), Deputy Chairman of the Economic and Social Research Council's Research Priorities Board (1997–2000) and on the Advisory Group of the Foresight Intelligent Infrastructures Project, as well as on many research council boards, both in the UK and abroad. As Chairman of the Royal Academy of Engineering's Group on Privacy and Surveillance, he published Dilemmas of Privacy and Surveillance: Challenges of Technological Change (2007). He was a member of the Sociology sub-panel for the 2001 and 2008 Research Assessment Exercises (RAE).

From 2012 to 2016, he was a member of the Social Science Expert Panel for DEFRA and DECC. The panel's purpose was to bring high quality, multi-disciplinary social science advice to both departments. In 2016, it was replaced by the Social Science Expert Group (SSEG), a sub-group of the DEFRA Science Advisory Council, on which he served until 2023.

He was a member of the European Commission's Advisory Group for the Future and Emerging Technologies programme from 2013 to 2018.

=== Awards and scientific recognitions ===
In 1999, he was appointed Fellow of the Royal Academy of Engineering in recognition of his work as "a pioneer of the application of computer modelling to social science", becoming the first practising social scientist to become a Fellow. He was awarded a Doctor of Science degree by the University of Cambridge in 2003. He is also a Fellow of the British Computer Society and of the Royal Society of Arts and a Fellow of the Academy of the Social Sciences (for which he served as a Council Member). From 2004 to 2006, he was President of the European Social Simulation Association (ESSA).

Gilbert was appointed Commander of the Order of the British Empire (CBE) in the 2016 Birthday Honours for services to engineering and the social sciences.

== Selected works on social simulation ==
- Gilbert, Nigel; Doran, Jim, eds. (1994). Simulating societies: The computer simulation of social phenomena. London: UCL Press. ISBN 1-85728-082-2.
- Gilbert, Nigel; Conte, Rosaria (1995). Artificial Societies: The Computer Simulation of Social Life. Taylor & Francis. ISBN 1-85728-305-8.
- Gilbert, Nigel; Troitzsch, Klaus G. (2005) [1999]. Simulation for the social scientist. Milton Keynes: Open University Press. ISBN 0-335-21600-5.
- Gilbert, Nigel (2008). Agent-based models. London: Sage Publications. ISBN 978-1-4129-4964-4.
- Gilbert, Nigel (2010). Computational Social Science. London: Sage Publications. ISBN 978-1847871718.

== Other works ==
- Gilbert, Nigel; Mulkay, Michael (1984). Opening Pandora's Box: A sociological analysis of scientists' discourse. Cambridge: Cambridge University Press. ISBN 0-521-27430-3.
- Gilbert, Nigel, ed. (2008) [1992]. Researching Social Life. London: Sage Publications. ISBN 978-0-7619-7245-7.
- Gilbert, Nigel, ed. (2006). From postgraduate to social scientist: A guide to key skills. London: Sage Publications. ISBN 0-7619-4460-5.
- Fielding, Jane L.; Gilbert, Nigel (2006). Understanding social statistics. Sage Publications. ISBN 1-4129-1054-4.

== See also ==
- Agent-based model
- Artificial society
- Computational Sociology
- Social simulation
- Sociology and complexity science
