= Hypercommunication =

Sociological concept

Hypercommunication is a conceptual extension of French sociologist, philosopher, and cultural theorist Jean Baudrillard's theories on communication's rapid evolution in an increasingly digital and media-intensive environment. In simpler terms, hypercommunication is excess inbound or outbound communication, often precipitated by technology.

Baudrillard discussed hypercommunication as the acceleration of everyday communication which eliminates all distance, mystery, and meaning. The term is also used to describe the accelerated communication patterns emerging from the widespread use of smartphones in the 21st century.

Hypercommunication is characterized as a dramatic increase in telecommunication events and exchanges, leading to a significant shift where omnipresence and constant availability, often perceived as an ethical obligation, has transformed everyday social behavior and psychological well-being potentially resulting in a form of self-enslavement to technology.
