= Social simulation =

Research field that applies to methods of studying issues in social science

Social simulation is a research field that applies computational methods to study issues in the social sciences. The issues explored include problems in computational law, psychology, organizational behavior, sociology, political science, economics, anthropology, geography, engineering, archaeology and linguistics (Takahashi, Sallach & Rouchier 2007).

Social simulation aims to cross the gap between the descriptive approach used in the social sciences and the formal approach used in the natural sciences, by moving the focus on the processes/mechanisms/behaviors that build the social reality.

In social simulation, computers support human reasoning activities by executing these mechanisms. This field explores the simulation of societies as complex non-linear systems, which are difficult to study with classical mathematical equation-based models. Robert Axelrod regards social simulation as a third way of doing science, differing from both the deductive and inductive approach; generating data that can be analysed inductively, but coming from a rigorously specified set of rules rather than from direct measurement of the real world. Thus, simulating a phenomenon is akin to generating it—constructing artificial societies. These ambitious aims have encountered several criticisms.

The social simulation approach to the social sciences is promoted and coordinated by four regional associations, the European Social Simulation Association (ESSA) for Europe, the Asian Social Simulation Association (ASSA) for Asia, the Computational Social Science Society of the Americas (CSSS) in North America, and the Pan-Asian Association for Agent-based Approach in Social Systems Sciences (PAAA) in Pacific Asia.

== History and development ==
The history of the agent-based model can be traced back to the Von Neumann machine, a theoretical machine capable of reproducing itself. The device John von Neumann proposed woud follow precisely detailed instructions to fashion a copy of itself. The concept was then improved by von Neumann's friend Stanislaw Ulam, also a mathematician; Ulam suggested that the machine be built on paper, as a collection of cells on a grid. The idea intrigued von Neumann, who drew it up—creating the first of devices later termed cellular automata.

Another improvement was brought by mathematician, John Conway. He constructed the well-known Game of Life. Unlike the von Neumann's machine, Conway's Game of Life operated by simple rules in a virtual world in the form of a 2-dimensional checkerboard.

The birth of the agent-based model as a model for social systems was primarily brought about by a computer scientist, Craig Reynolds. He tried to model the reality of lively biological agents, known as the artificial life, a term coined by Christopher Langton.

Joshua M. Epstein and Robert Axtell developed the first large scale agent model, the Sugarscape, to simulate and explore the role of social phenomena such as seasonal migrations, pollution, sexual reproduction, combat, transmission of disease, and even culture.

Kathleen M. Carley published "Computational Organizational Science and Organizational Engineering" defining the movement of simulation into organizations, established a journal for social simulation applied to organizations and complex socio-technical systems: Computational and Mathematical Organization Theory, and was the founding president of the North American Association of Computational Social and Organizational Systems that morphed into the current CSSSA.

Nigel Gilbert published with Klaus G. Troitzsch the first textbook on social simulation: "Simulation for the Social Scientist" (1999) and established its most relevant journal: the Journal of Artificial Societies and Social Simulation.

More recently, Ron Sun developed methods for basing agent-based simulation on models of human cognition, known as cognitive social simulation (see (Sun 2006))

== Topics ==
Here are some sample topics that have been explored with social simulation:

- Social norms: Robert Axelrod has used simulations to investigate the foundation of morality; others have modeled the emergence of norms using memes, or how social norms and emotions can regulate each other.
- Institutions: by investigating under what conditions agents manage to coordinate, or by modeling the works of Robert Putnam on civic traditions
- Reputation, for example by making agents with a model of reputation from Pierre Bourdieu (image, social esteem, and prestige) and observing their behavior in a virtual marketplace.
- Knowledge transmission and the social process of science: there is a special section on that topic in the Journal of Artificial Societies and Social Simulation
- Elections: Kim (2011) has modeled a psychological model of judgement from previous research (notably featuring motivated reasoning), and compared the statistical regularities of the simulation with empirical observations of voter behavior; others have compared delegation methods.
- Economics: see computational economics and agent-based computational economics.

== Types of simulation and modeling ==
Social simulation can refer to a general class of strategies for understanding social dynamics using computers to simulate social systems. Social simulation allows for a more systematic way of viewing the possibilities of outcomes.

There are four major types of social simulation:

1. System level simulation.
2. System level modeling.
3. Agent-based simulation.
4. Agent-based modeling.

A social simulation may fall within the rubric of computational sociology which is a recently developed branch of sociology that uses computation to analyze social phenomena. The basic premise of computational sociology is to take advantage of computer simulations (Polhill & Edmonds 2007) in the construction of social theories. It involves the understanding of social agents, the interaction among these agents, and the effect of these interactions on the social aggregate. Although the subject matter and methodologies in social science differ from those in natural science or computer science, several of the approaches used in contemporary social simulation originated from fields such as physics and artificial intelligence.

=== System level simulation ===
System Level Simulation (SLS) is the oldest level of social simulation. System level simulation looks at the situation as a whole. This theoretical outlook on social situations uses a wide range of information to determine what should happen to society and its members if certain variables are present. Therefore, with specific variables presented, society and its members should have a certain response to the new situation. Navigating through this theoretical simulation will allow researchers to develop educated ideas of what will happen under some specific variables.

For example, if NASA were to conduct a system level simulation it would benefit the organization by providing a cost-effective research method to navigate through the simulation. This allows the researcher to steer through the virtual possibilities of the given simulation and develop safety procedures, and to produce proven facts about how a certain situation will play out. (National Research 2006)

=== System level modeling ===
System level modeling (SLM) aims to specifically predict (unlike system level simulation's generalization in prediction) and convey any number of actions, behaviors, or other theoretical possibilities of nearly any person, object, construct et cetera within a system using a large set of mathematical equations and computer programming in the form of models.

A model is a representation of a specific thing ranging from objects and people to structures and products created through mathematical equations and are designed, using computers, in such a way that they are able to stand-in as the aforementioned things in a study. Models can be either simplistic or complex, depending on the need for either; however, models are intended to be simpler than what they are representing while remaining realistically similar in order to be used accurately. They are built using a collection of data that is translated into computing languages that allow them to represent the system in question. These models, much like simulations, are used to help us better understand specific roles and actions of different things so as to predict behavior and the like.

=== Agent-based simulation ===
Agent-based social simulation (ABSS) consists of modeling different societies after artificial agents, (varying on scale) and placing them in a computer simulated society to observe the behaviors of the agents. From this data it is possible to learn about the reactions of the artificial agents and translate them into the results of non-artificial agents and simulations. Three main fields in ABSS are agent-based computing, social science, and computer simulation.

Agent-based computing is the design of the model and agents, while the computer simulation is the part of the simulation of the agents in the model and the outcomes. The social science is a mixture of sciences and social part of the model. It is where the social phenomena is developed and theorized. The main purpose of ABSS is to provide models and tools for agent-based simulation of social phenomena. With ABSS we can explore different outcomes for phenomena where we might not be able to view the outcome in real life. It can provide us valuable information on society and the outcomes of social events or phenomena.

=== Agent-based modeling ===
Agent-based modeling (ABM) is a system in which a collection of agents independently interact on networks. Each individual agent is responsible for different behaviors that result in collective behaviors. These behaviors as a whole help to define the workings of the network. ABM focuses on human social interactions and how people work together and communicate with one another without having one, single "group mind". This essentially means that it tends to focus on the consequences of interactions between people (the agents) in a population. Researchers are better able to understand this type of modeling by modeling these dynamics on a smaller, more localized level. Essentially, ABM helps to better understand interactions between people (agents) who, in turn, influence one another (in response to these influences). Simple individual rules or actions can result in coherent group behavior. Changes in these individual acts can affect the collective group in any given population.

Agent-based modeling is an experimental tool for theoretical research. It enables one to deal with more complex individual behaviors, such as adaptation. Overall, through this type of modeling, the creator, or researcher, aims to model behavior of agents and the communication between them in order to better understand how these individual interactions impact an entire population. In essence, ABM is a way of modeling and understanding different global patterns.

== Current research ==
There are several current research projects that relate directly to modeling and agent-based simulation the following are listed below with a brief overview.

- "Generative e-Social Science for Socio-Spatial Simulation" or (GENESIS) is a research node of the UK National Centre for e-Social Science funded by the UK research council ESRC.
- "National e-Infrastructure for Social Simulation" or (NeISS) is a UK-based project funded by JISC.
- "Network Models Governance and R&D collaboration networks" or (N.E.M.O) is a research centre whose main focus is to identify ways to create and to assess desirable network structures for typical functions; (e.g. knowledge, creation, transfer, and distribution.) This research will ultimately aid policy-makers at all political levels in improving the effectiveness and efficiency of network-based policy instruments at promoting the knowledge economy in Europe.
- "Agent-based Simulations of Market and Consumer Behavior" is another research group that is funded by the Unilever Corporate Research. The current research that is being conducted is investigating the usefulness of agent-based simulations for modeling consumer behavior and to show the potential value and insights it can add to long-established marketing methods.
- "New and Emergent World Models Through Individual, Evolutionary and Social Learning" or (New Ties) is a three-year project that will ultimately create a virtual society developed by agent-based simulation. The project will develop a simulated society capable of exploring the environment and developing its own image of this environment and the society through interaction. The goal of the research project is for the simulated society to exhibit individual learning, evolutionary learning and social learning.
- Bruch and Mare's project on neighborhood segregation: The purpose of the study is to figure out the reasoning for neighborhood segregation based on race, and to figure out the tipping point or when people become uncomfortable with the integration levels into their neighborhood, and decide to flee from the neighborhood. They set up a model using flash cards, and put the agent's house in the middle and put houses of different races surrounding the agent's house. They asked people how comfortable they would feel with different situations; if they were okay with one situation, they asked another until the neighborhood was fully integrated. Bruch and Mare's results showed that the tipping point was at 50%. When a neighborhood became 50% minority and 50% white, people of both races began to become uncomfortable and white flight began to rise. The use of agent-based modeling showed how useful it can be in the world of sociology, people did not have to answer why they would become uncomfortable, just which situation they were uncomfortable with.
- The MAELIA Program (Multi-Agent Emergent Norms Assessment) is a project dealing with the relationships between the users and managers of a natural resource, in that case water, and the related norms and laws that are to be built within them (conventions) or are imposed to them by other actors (institutions). The purpose of the project is to build a generic multiscale platform which is planned to deal with water conflict-related issues.
- The Mosi-Agil project is a four-year program funded by the Autonomous Region of Madrid through the program MOSI-AGIL-CM (grant S2013/ICE-3019, co-funded by EU Structural Funds FSE and FEDER). It aims at creating a body of knowledge and practical tools which are necessary to handle more effectively the behavior of occupants of large facilities. Therefore, the project studies the development of ambient intelligence and intelligent environments supported by the use of Agent-Based Social Simulation.

Agent-based modeling is most useful in providing a bridge between micro and macro levels, which is a large part of what sociology studies. Agent-based models are most appropriate for studying processes that lack central coordination, including the emergence of institutions that, once established, impose order from the top down. The models focus on how simple and predictable local interactions generate familiar but highly detailed global patterns, such as emergence of norms and participation of collective action. Michael W. Macy and Robert Willer researched a recent survey of applications and found that there were two main problems with agent-based modeling the self-organization of social structure and the emergence of social order (Macy & Willer 2002). Below is a brief description of each problem Macy and Willer believe there to be;

1. "Emergent structure. In these models, agents change location or behavior in response to social influences or selection pressures. Agents may start out undifferentiated and then change location or behavior so as to avoid becoming different or isolated (or in some cases, overcrowded). Rather than producing homogeneity, however, these conformist decisions aggregate to produce global patterns of cultural differentiation, stratification, and homophilic clustering in local networks. Other studies reverse the process, starting with a heterogeneous population and ending in convergence: the coordination, diffusion, and sudden collapse of norms, conventions, innovations, and technological standards."
2. "Emergent social order. These studies show how egoistic adaptation can lead to successful collective action without either altruism or global (top down) imposition of control. A key finding across numerous studies is that the viability of trust, cooperation, and collective action depends decisively on the embeddedness of interaction."

These examples simply show the complexity of our environment and that agent-based models are designed to explore the minimal conditions, the simplest set of assumptions about human behavior, required for a given social phenomenon to emerge at a higher level of organization.

== Criticisms ==
Since its creation, computerized social simulation has been the target of some criticism in regard to its practicality and accuracy. Social simulation's simplification of the complex to form models from which we can better understand the latter is sometimes seen as a draw back, as using fairly simple models to simulate real life with computers is not always the best way to predict behavior.

Most of the criticism seems to be aimed at agent-based models and simulation and how they work:

1. Simulations, being man-made from mathematical interfaces, predict human behavior in a far too simple manner in regard to the complexities of humanity and our actions.
2. Simulations cannot enlighten researchers as to how people interact or behave in ways not programmed into their models. For this reason, the scope of simulations are limited in that the researchers must already know what they are going to find (to a degree, for they cannot find anything they themselves did not place in the model) at least vaguely, possibly skewing the results.
3. Due to the complexities of what is being measured, simulations must be analyzed in unbiased ways; however, with the model running on a pre-made set of instructions coded into it by a modeler, biases exist almost universally.
4. It is highly difficult and often impractical to attempt to link the findings from the abstract world the simulation creates and our complex society and all of its variation.

Researchers working in social simulation might respond that the competing theories from the social sciences are far simpler than those achieved through simulation and therefore suffer the aforementioned drawbacks much more strongly. Theories in some social science tend to be linear models that are not dynamic, and are generally inferred from small laboratory experiments (laboratory tests are most common in psychology but rare in sociology, political science, economics and geography). The behavior of populations of agents under these models is rarely tested or verified against empirical observation.

== See also ==
- Agent-based computational economics
- Agent-based social simulation
- Artificial consciousness
- Artificial reality
- Artificial society
- Computational sociology
- Cliodynamics
- Interactive online characters
- Journal of Artificial Societies and Social Simulation
- Simulated reality
- Synthetic Environment for Analysis and Simulations
- System dynamics
- Virtual reality
