= Agent-based social simulation =

Agent-based social simulation (or ABSS) consists of social simulations that are based on agent-based modeling, and implemented using artificial agent technologies. Agent-based social simulation is a scientific discipline concerned with simulation of social phenomena, using computer-based multiagent models. In these simulations, persons or group of persons are represented by agents. MABSS is a combination of social science, multiagent simulation and computer simulation.

ABSS models the different elements of the social systems using artificial agents, (varying on scale) and placing them in a computer simulated society to observe the behaviors of the agents. From this data it is possible to learn about the reactions of the artificial agents and translate them into the results of non-artificial agents and simulations. Three main fields in ABSS are agent-based computing, social science, and computer simulation.

Agent-based computing is the design of the model and agents, while the computer simulation is the part of the simulation of the agents in the model and the outcomes. The social science is a mixture of sciences and social part of the model. It is where social phenomena are developed and theorized. The main purpose of ABSS is to provide models and tools for agent-based simulation of social phenomena. With ABSS, one can explore different outcomes of phenomena where it may not be possible to view the outcome in real life. It can provide us valuable information on society and the outcomes of social events or phenomena.

== Multi-agent system ==
A multi-agent system is a system created from multiple autonomous elements interacting with each other. These are called agents. In a multi-agent system, each agent is represented by an individual algorithm. See Agent-based model.

Agents can be used to simulate many different active elements, including organisms, machines, persons, corporations and other organizations, nations, and so on. Agent-based models can be used to simulate a wide variety of social phenomena, including transportation, market failures, cooperation and escalation and spreading of conflicts. In agent-based models illustrate how models based on simple rules can results in complex dynamics and emergent behavior (Kontopoulos, 1993; Archer, 1995; Sawyer, 2001).

== History ==
=== Sugarscape ===
The first widely known multi-agent generative social model was developed in 1996 by Joshua M. Epstein and Robert Axtell. The purpose of this model was simulation and research of social phenomena like seasonal migration, environmental pollution, procreation, combat, disease spreading and cultural features. Their model is based on the work of economist Thomas Schelling, presented in his paper "Models of Segregation". This model defined the first generation of computer-based social simulations. Epstein and Axtell's model was implemented using concepts from the "Game of Life" developed by John Horton Conway.

== Usage for social sciences ==
There are three main objects of scientific implementation of ABSS (Gilbert, Trotzsch; 2005)

=== Understanding basic aspects of social phenomena ===
Like aspects involving its diffusion, dynamics or results. Such basic models should be based on simple rules, so that a system's resulting emergent behavior can be easily observable.

=== Prediction ===
These models are implemented to predict real life events and phenomena. Examples of use could be transportation (prediction of traffic in future to find places where traffic jams could occur), prediction of future unemployment rates etc. Problem of models made to accurately predict such an events is increasing complexity of model with number of dynamically changing parameters.

=== Research, testing and formulation of hypothesis ===
Unlike other two main objects, which have use outside Social sciences, latter one is used mainly on the field of social science. Agent-based social simulations are often used during research of new hypothesis. Simulation could be useful when there is no other way to observe agents during their actions. For example, during creation of new language, which is long-term process. Another benefit of simulation lies in fact, that to be able to prove theory in simulation, it has to be represented in formal and logical form. This leads to more coherent formulation of theory.

== Multi-agent simulation suites (MASS) usage for problem solving ==
=== Models of information diffusion in social environment ===
An academic article investigates an agent-based simulation of information diffusion in Facebook online social network.

=== Emergence of social phenomena ===
Altruism and cooperation Ethnocentrism

=== Crowd behaviour ===
Models for natural disasters (evacuation – fire)

=== Business ===
Market behavior models

== Software used for implementing ABSS ==
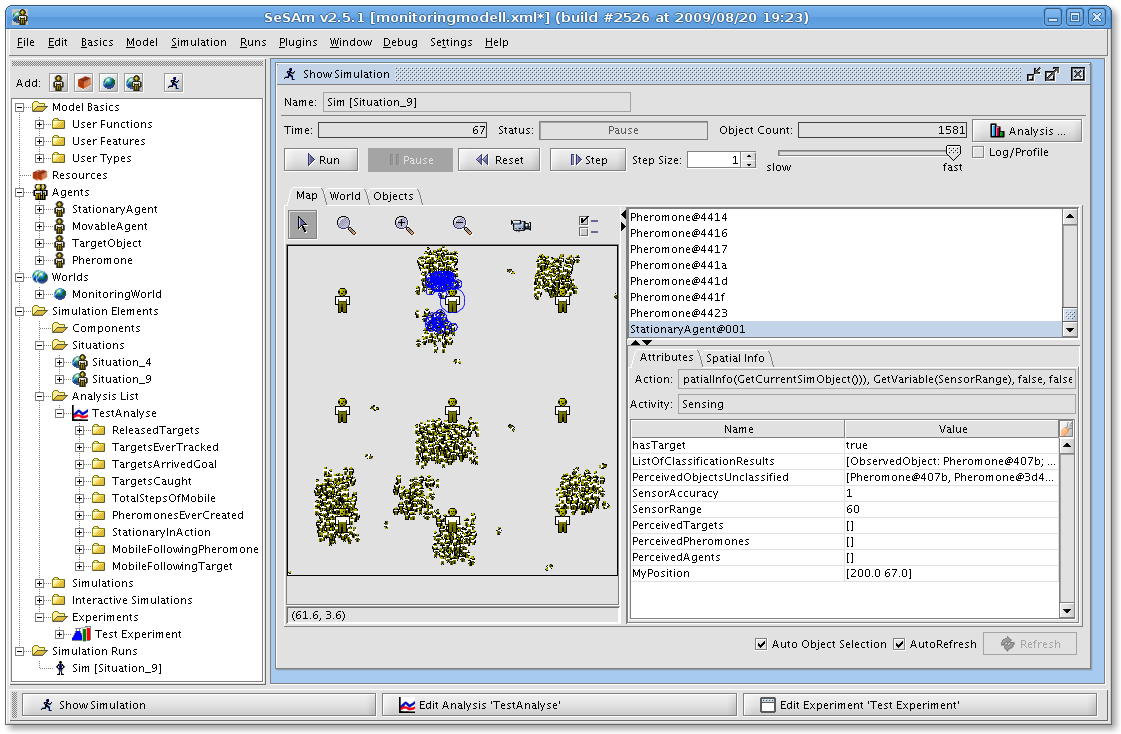
SeSAm running an agent-based model

Different agent based software have been used for implementing ABSS (Tobias & Hofmann 2004) such as

- Repast
- Swarm (simulation) (Terna 1998)
- NetLogo (Open Source Software)
- MASON Multi-Agent Simulator Of Neighborhoods. (Open Source Software)

== See also ==
- Artificial life
- Simulated reality
- Social simulation
- Journal of Artificial Societies and Social Simulation

== Further studies ==
- Auer, Klaus; Norris, Tim (2001). ""ArrierosAlife" a Multi-Agent Approach Simulating the Evolution of a Social System: Modeling the Emergence of Social Networks with "Ascape"". Journal of Artificial Societies and Social Simulation. 4 (1).
- Epstein, Joshua; Axtell, Robert (1996). Growing Artificial Societies: Social Science from the Bottom-Up. MIT Press. p. 208. ISBN 0-262-55025-3.
- Pavon, Juan; Sansores, Candelaria; Gomez-Sanz, Jorge J.; Wang, Fei-Yue (2008). "Modelling and simulation of social systems with INGENIAS". International Journal of Agent-Oriented Software Engineering. 2 (2): 196–221. doi:10.1504/IJAOSE.2008.017315.
- Terna, Pietro (1998). "Simulation Tools for Social Scientists: Building Agent Based Models with SWARM". Journal of Artificial Societies and Social Simulation. 1 (2).
- Tobias, Robert; Hofmann, Carole (2004). "Evaluation of free Java-libraries for social-scientific agent based simulation". Journal of Artificial Societies and Social Simulation. 7 (1).
- EPSTEIN, Joshua M.; AXTELL, Robert. Growing Artificial Societies: social science from the bottom up. MIT Press. 1996, ISBN 0-262-55025-3.
- EPSTEIN, Joshua M. Generative Social Science: studies in agent-based computational modeling. Princeton University Press. 2006
- GILBERT, N. and Troitzsch, K. G. (1999). Simulation for the Social Scientist, Open University Press.
