= Synthetic population =

Synthetic population is artificial population data that fits the distribution of people and their relevant characteristics living in a specified area as according to the demographics from census data. Synthetic populations are often a basis for microsimulation or also agent based models of population behavior. The latter can be used for simulation of disease transmission, traffic and similar.

Synthetic population are initial sets of agents with detailed demographic and socioeconomic attributes, which allow execution of agent-based microsimulation. Due to privacy reasons and data limitations and restrict observability of entire real population. Therefore, the population synthesis procedure is applied, which expands a small data sample of population by using auxiliary data, to generate a synthetic population as close as possible to the real population in its characteristics.

== Examples of application ==
Chicago Social Interaction Model (chiSIM) is an agent-based simulation of individuals and locations in Chicago along with their daily behavior. The population is modeled as a set of heterogeneous, interacting, adaptive agents. These agents are the population of all the residents of Chicago.

In 2023, World Data Lab created a synthetic population for New York using microdata and summary statistics. It was used to calculate the poverty levels among the neighborhoods for targeted social programs.

A synthetic population for the United States, United Kingdom, Japan and Germany was built and is marketed by Statista under the name SynthiePop. It was already applied together with the German Federal Railway Authority to study the local impact of cheaper public transport passes.

In Switzerland, the Swiss Federal Office for Spatial Development and the Swiss Federal Railways created a synthetic population to better plan traffic.
