= Digital environment =

Integrated communications environment

A digital environment is an integrated communications environment where digital devices communicate and manage the content and activities within it. The concept is based on digital electronics systems which are integrated and implemented for a global community. Major components of a digital environment generally include websites, cloud servers, search engines, social media outlets, mobile apps, audio and video, and other web-based resources.

== In business ==
A digital environment in business includes every resource that is either a computer-, mobile device-, or electronically-based resource in the organization in an integrated system. If an organization conducts business activities through the Internet or any other electronic-based communications system, including websites, e-mail, search engine optimization strategies, social media marketing, podcasts, webinars, and even voice over IP phone service (VOIP), they are conducting these activities in a digital environment. As they conduct these activities within their digital environment, they deal with interactions, transactions and relationships with other organizations' digital environments. Ultimately, the global business community participates in a comprehensive digital environment.

As organizations see their daily activities within a digital environment, the integrations between the various activities generally become stronger and intentional. Optimum digital environments require communications and integrations within individual devices, such as computers, servers, mobile devices, and other personal digitally-based devices, as well as communications and integrations between computer software applications and programs. For example, a digital environment in an organization includes systems of email servers, storage/data servers, accounting software programs, web-based applications, customer relationship management (CRM) applications and websites. An optimum digital environment would include the strategy and implementation of all of those systems, software programs and applications to work in an integrated environment, which allows them to communicate with each other and with other digital environments outside the organization.

== Digital communication environments ==
Digital communication environments (DCE) are well known as computer networks. Many digital communication environments contain a central hub, which is connected to everything in some form. This hub can be located inside a networking system, or could be referred to as the internet itself.

The digital world includes the sensors that automatically pick up information.

== Digital social environments ==
Digital social environments (DSE) are well known as social networking sites. Many digital social environments need one central server to distribute information to each of its clients.

== Other ==
Many of the environments we encounter can be reproduced in a digital environment, such as an immersive digital environment in which an artificial, interactive, computer-created scene or "world" is generated for the user to be placed in. We find most immersive digital environments in theme parks.

== See also ==
- Digital footprint
