= Agent-based computational economics =

Systems-based study of economic processes

Agent-based computational economics (ACE) is the area of computational economics that studies economic processes, including whole economies, as dynamic systems of interacting agents. As such, it falls in the paradigm of complex adaptive systems. In corresponding agent-based models, the "agents" are "computational objects modeled as interacting according to rules" over space and time, not real people. The rules are formulated to model behavior and social interactions based on incentives and information. Such rules could also be the result of optimization, realized through use of AI methods (such as Q-learning and other reinforcement learning techniques).

As part of non-equilibrium economics, the theoretical assumption of mathematical optimization by agents in equilibrium is replaced by the less restrictive postulate of agents with bounded rationality adapting to market forces. ACE models apply numerical methods of analysis to computer-based simulations of complex dynamic problems for which more conventional methods, such as theorem formulation, may not find ready use. Starting from initial conditions specified by the modeler, the computational economy evolves over time as its constituent agents repeatedly interact with each other, including learning from interactions. In these respects, ACE has been characterized as a bottom-up culture-dish approach to the study of economic systems.

ACE has a similarity to, and overlap with, game theory as an agent-based method for modeling social interactions. But practitioners have also noted differences from standard methods, for example in ACE events modeled being driven solely by initial conditions, whether or not equilibria exist or are computationally tractable, and in the modeling facilitation of agent autonomy and learning.

The method has benefited from continuing improvements in modeling techniques of computer science and increased computer capabilities. The ultimate scientific objective of the method is to "test theoretical findings against real-world data in ways that permit empirically supported theories to cumulate over time, with each researcher's work building appropriately on the work that has gone before". The subject has been applied to research areas like asset pricing, energy systems, competition and collaboration, transaction costs, market structure and industrial organization and dynamics, welfare economics, and mechanism design, information and uncertainty, macroeconomics, and Marxist economics.

Recent integrations of reinforcement learning and deep learning architectures have enabled simulation of AI-driven agents in complex multi-agent economic models, enhancing realism and emergent behaviour forecasting.

== Overview ==
The "agents" in ACE models can represent individuals (e.g. people), social groupings (e.g. firms), biological entities (e.g. growing crops), and/or physical systems (e.g. transport systems). The ACE modeler provides the initial configuration of a computational economic system comprising multiple interacting agents. The modeler then steps back to observe the development of the system over time without further intervention. In particular, system events should be driven by agent interactions without external imposition of equilibrium conditions. Issues include those common to experimental economics in general and development of a common framework for empirical validation and resolving open questions in agent-based modeling.

ACE is an officially designated special interest group (SIG) of the Society for Computational Economics. Researchers at the Santa Fe Institute have contributed to the development of ACE.

== Agent-based finance ==
One area where ACE methodology has frequently been applied is asset pricing. W. Brian Arthur, Eric Baum, William Brock, Cars Hommes, and Blake LeBaron, among others, have developed computational models in which many agents choose from a set of possible forecasting strategies in order to predict stock prices, which affects their asset demands and thus affects stock prices. These models assume that agents are more likely to choose forecasting strategies which have recently been successful. The success of any strategy will depend on market conditions and also on the set of strategies that are currently being used. These models frequently find that large booms and busts in asset prices may occur as agents switch across forecasting strategies. More recently, Brock, Hommes, and Wagener (2009) have used a model of this type to argue that the introduction of new hedging instruments may destabilize the market, and some papers have suggested that ACE might be a useful methodology for understanding the 2008 financial crisis. See also discussion under Financial economics § Financial markets and § Departures from rationality.

== Agent-based macroeconomics ==
Agent-Based Macroeconomics (ABM) builds understanding of the economy from the very bottom up. Instead of broad averages, ABM explicitly simulates many diverse, heterogeneous agents. Each agent operates with specific rules for behavior and learning. They also form expectations in unique ways. This "bottom-up" philosophy traces back to Herbert Simon's early work. Economic events emerge organically from the agents' interactions. They are not simply caused by external shocks. ABM incorporates empirically-informed behavioral rules. It also represents persistent heterogeneity among agents. Explicit institutional structures and market frictions are included too.

== See also ==
- Agent-based social simulation
- Artificial financial market
- Computational economics
- Econophysics
- Macroeconomic model
- Multi-agent system
- Statistical finance
