= Artificial society =

Computational model

An artificial society is an agent-based computational model for computer simulation in social analysis. It is mostly connected to the themes of complex systems, emergence, the Monte Carlo method, computational sociology, multi-agent systems, and evolutionary programming. While the concept was simple, actually realizing this conceptual point took a while. Complex mathematical models have been, and are, common; deceivingly simple models only have their roots in the late forties, and took the advent of the microcomputer to really get up to speed.

== Overview ==
The aim is to construct parallel simulations consisting of computational devices, referred to as agents, with given properties, in order to model the target phenomena. The subject is the process of emergence from the lower (micro) level of a social system to the higher (or macro) level.

The history of agent-based modeling can be traced back to Von Neumann machines, the concept of a machine capable of reproduction. The device he proposed would follow precisely detailed instructions to fashion a copy of itself. The concept was then extended by von Neumann's friend Stanislaw Ulam, also a mathematician, who suggested that the machine be built on paper, as a collection of cells on a grid. The idea intrigued von Neumann, who drew it up, thus creating the first of the devices later termed cellular automata.

A further advance was achieved by mathematician John Conway. He constructed the well-known game of life. Unlike von Neumann's machine, Conway's Game of Life operated according to tremendously simple rules in a virtual world in the form of a 2-dimensional checkerboard.

The application of the agent-based model as a social model was primarily initiated by computer scientist Craig Reynolds. He attempted to model living biological agents, a method known as artificial life, a term coined by Christopher Langton.

The computational methods of artificial life were applied to the analysis of social systems, christened "the artificial society" by Joshua M. Epstein and Robert Axtell. Eventually, the artificial society provided a new method for sociological analysis in the form of computational sociology. The principal problem is that of classical sociology, the issue of macro-micro linkage: as first articulated by French Sociologist Émile Durkheim, the question of how individuals within a social system influence and are influenced by the macrosocial level.

The artificial society has been widely accepted by recent sociology as a promising method characterized by the extensive use of computer programs and computer simulations which include evolutionary algorithms (EA), genetic algorithms (GA), genetic programming (GP), memetic programming (MP), agent based models, and cellular automata (CA).

For many, artificial society is a meeting point for people from many other more traditional fields in interdisciplinary research, such as linguistics, social physics, mathematics, philosophy, law, computer science, biology, and sociology in which unusual computational and theoretical approaches that would be controversial within their native discipline can be discussed. As a field, it has had a controversial history; some have characterized it as "practical theology" or a "fact-free science". However, the recent publication of artificial society articles in the scientific journals e.g.: Journal of Artificial Societies and Social Simulation and Journal of Social Complexity shows that artificial life techniques are becoming somewhat more accepted within the sociological mainstream.

== See also ==
- Agent-based model
- Boids
- Complex system
- Computational sociology
- Emergence
- Evolutionary algorithm
- Simulated reality
- Social complexity
- Social simulation
