= Computational and Mathematical Organization Theory =

- Discipline: Organization theory
- Language: English
- Edited by: Kathleen M. Carley, Terrill L. Frantz

Publication details
- History: 1995–present
- Publisher: Springer Science+Business Media
- Frequency: Quarterly
- Impact factor: 2.023 (2020)

Standard abbreviations
- ISO 4: Comput. Math. Organ. Theory

Indexing
- ISSN: 1381-298X (print); 1572-9346 (web)
- LCCN: sn97047289
- OCLC no.: 41558316

Links
- Journal homepage; Online access

Computational and Mathematical Organization Theory is a quarterly double-blind peer-reviewed scientific journal covering the field of organization theory. The journal is published by Springer Science+Business Media. It was established in 1995 and initially published by Kluwer. The founding editors-in-chief were William A. Wallace (Rensselaer Polytechnic Institute) and Kathleen Carley (Carnegie Mellon University). Carley has continued as co-editor-in-chief, a role she currently shares with Terrill L. Frantz (Harrisburg University of Science and Technology).

== Abstracting and indexing ==
Computational and Mathematical Organization Theory is abstracted and indexed in ACM Digital Library, CSA databases, Current Contents, Current Index to Statistics, Digital Bibliography & Library Project, EBSCO databases, Engineered Materials Abstracts, Inspec, InfoTrac, International Bibliography of the Social Sciences, ProQuest, Science Citation Index, Scopus, Social Sciences Citation Index, VINITI Database RAS, and Zentralblatt MATH. According to the Journal Citation Reports, the journal has a 2020 impact factor of 2.023.
