= Agent-based model =

Type of computational models

An agent-based model (ABM) is a computational model for simulating the actions and interactions of an autonomous agent (both individual or collective entities such as organizations or groups) to understand the behavior of a system and what governs its outcomes. It combines elements of game theory, complex systems, emergence, computational sociology, multi-agent systems, and evolutionary programming. Monte Carlo methods are used to understand the stochasticity of these models. Particularly within ecology, an ABM is also called an individual-based model (IBM). A review of literature on individual-based models, agent-based models, and multiagent systems shows that ABMs are used in many scientific domains including biology, ecology, and social science. Agent-based modeling is related to, but distinct from, the concept of a multi-agent system .

An agent-based model is a type of microscale model that simulates the simultaneous operations and interactions of multiple agents in an attempt to re-create and predict the appearance of complex phenomena. The process is one of emergence, which some express as "the whole is greater than the sum of its parts". In other words, higher-level system properties emerge from the interactions of lower-level subsystems. Or, macro-scale state changes emerge from micro-scale agent behaviors. Or, simple behaviors (meaning rules followed by agents) generate complex behaviors (meaning state changes at the whole system level).

An individual agent is typically characterized as boundedly rational, presumed to be acting in what it perceives as its their own interests, such as reproduction, economic benefit, or social status, using heuristics or simple decision-making rules. An ABM agent may experience "learning", adaptation, and reproduction.

An agent-based model is usually composed of (1) numerous agents specified at various scales (typically referred to as agent-granularity), (2) decision-making heuristics, (3) learning rules or adaptive processes,(4) an interaction topology, and (5) an environment. An ABM is typically implemented as a computer simulation, either as custom software or using an ABM toolkit. This software can be then used to test how changes in individual behavior will affect the system's overall behavior.

== History ==
The idea of agent-based modeling was developed as a relatively simple concept in the late 1940s. Since it requires computation-intensive procedures, it did not become widespread until the 1990s.

=== Early developments ===
The history of the agent-based model can be traced back to the Von Neumann machine, a theoretical machine capable of reproduction. The device von Neumann proposed would follow precisely detailed instructions to fashion a copy of itself. The concept was then built upon by von Neumann's friend Stanislaw Ulam, also a mathematician; Ulam suggested that the machine be built on paper, as a collection of cells on a grid. The idea intrigued von Neumann, who drew it up — creating the first of the devices later termed cellular automata.

Oliver Selfridge's 1958 Pandemonium - A Paradigm for Learning paper was an important early theorectical contribution in establishing agent orientated architecture, though it used the term metaphorical 'demon' instead of agent. Carl Hewitt 1973 Actor model contained one of the earliest uses of agents as active entities rather than passive structures.

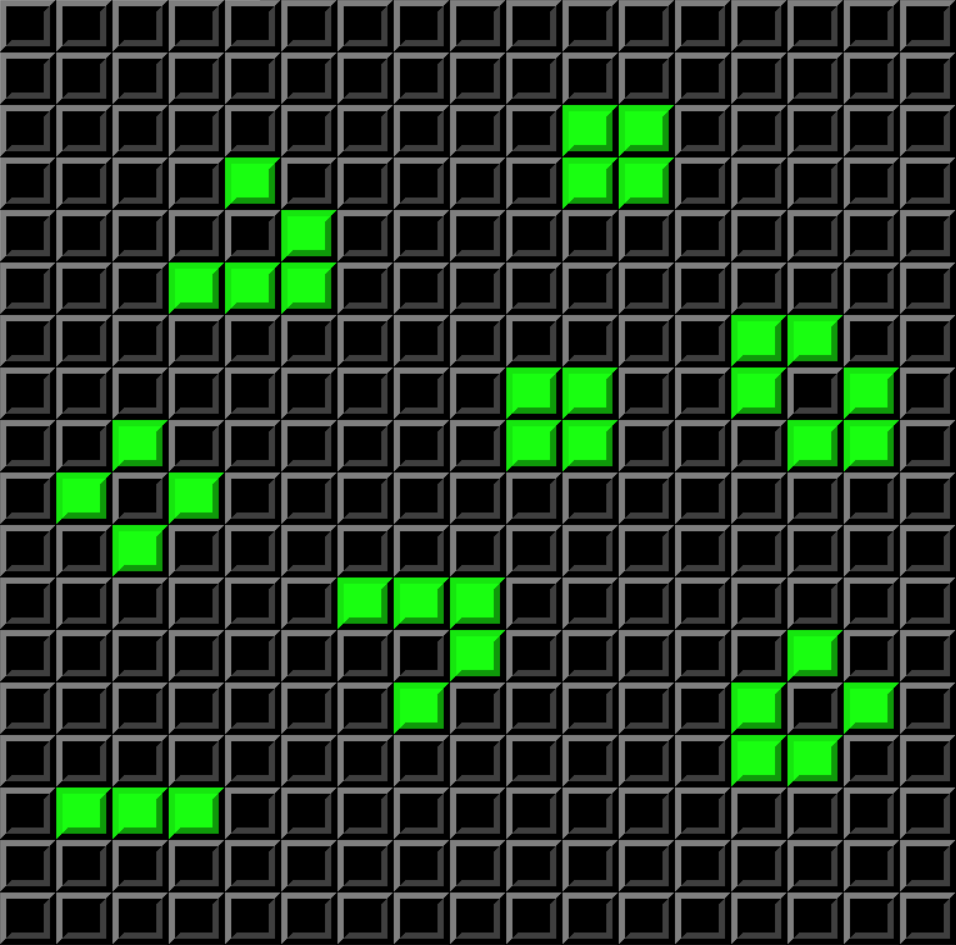
Conway's Game of Life

Another advance was introduced by the mathematician John Conway. He constructed the well-known Game of Life. Unlike von Neumann's machine, the Game of Life operated by simple rules in a virtual world in the form of a 2-dimensional checkerboard.

The Simula programming language, developed in the mid-1960s and widely implemented by the early 1970s, was the first framework for automating step-by-step agent simulations.

=== 1970s and 1980s: the first models ===
One of the earliest agent-based models in concept was Thomas Schelling's segregation model, which was discussed in his paper "Dynamic Models of Segregation" in 1971. Though Schelling originally used coins and graph paper rather than computers, his models embodied the basic concept of agent-based models as autonomous agents interacting in a shared environment with an observed aggregate, emergent outcome.

In the late 1970s, Paulien Hogeweg and Bruce Hesper began experimenting with individual models of ecology. One of their first results was to show that the social structure of bumble-bee colonies emerged as a result of simple rules that govern the behaviour of individual bees. They introduced the ToDo principle, referring to the way agents "do what there is to do" at any given time.

In the early 1980s, Robert Axelrod hosted a tournament of Prisoner's Dilemma strategies and had them interact in an agent-based manner to determine a winner. Axelrod would go on to develop many other agent-based models in the field of political science that examine phenomena from ethnocentrism to the dissemination of culture.

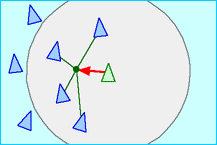
Flocking behavior model

By the late 1980s, Craig Reynolds' work on flocking models contributed to the development of some of the first biological agent-based models that contained social characteristics. He tried to model the reality of lively biological agents, known as artificial life, a term coined by Christopher Langton.

At the same time, during the 1980s, social scientists, mathematicians, operations researchers, and a scattering of people from other disciplines developed Computational and Mathematical Organization Theory (CMOT). This field grew as a special interest group of The Institute of Management Sciences (TIMS) and its sister society, the Operations Research Society of America (ORSA).

=== 1990s: expansion ===
The 1990s were especially notable for the expansion of ABM within the social sciences, one notable effort was the large-scale ABM, Sugarscape, developed by Joshua M. Epstein and Robert Axtell to simulate and explore the role of social phenomena such as seasonal migrations, pollution, sexual reproduction, combat, and transmission of disease and even culture. Other notable 1990s developments included Carnegie Mellon University's Kathleen Carley ABM, to explore the co-evolution of social networks and culture. The Santa Fe Institute (SFI) was important in encouraging the development of the ABM modeling platform Swarm under the leadership of Christopher Langton. Research conducted through SFI allowed the expansion of ABM techniques to a number of fields including study of the social and spatial dynamics of small-scale human societies and primates. During this 1990s timeframe Nigel Gilbert published the first textbook on Social Simulation: Simulation for the social scientist (1999) and established a journal from the perspective of social sciences: the Journal of Artificial Societies and Social Simulation (JASSS). Other than JASSS, agent-based models of any discipline are within scope of SpringerOpen journal Complex Adaptive Systems Modeling (CASM).

Through the mid-1990s, the social sciences thread of ABM began to focus on such issues as designing effective teams, understanding the communication required for organizational effectiveness, and the behavior of social networks. CMOT—later renamed Computational Analysis of Social and Organizational Systems (CASOS)—incorporated more and more agent-based modeling. Samuelson (2000) is a good brief overview of the early history, and Samuelson (2005) and Samuelson and Macal (2006) trace the more recent developments.

In the late 1990s, the merger of TIMS and ORSA to form INFORMS, and the move by INFORMS from two meetings each year to one, helped to spur the CMOT group to form a separate society, the North American Association for Computational Social and Organizational Sciences (NAACSOS). Kathleen Carley was a major contributor, especially to models of social networks, obtaining National Science Foundation funding for the annual conference and serving as the first president of NAACSOS. She was succeeded by David Sallach of the University of Chicago and Argonne National Laboratory, and then by Michael Prietula of Emory University. At about the same time NAACSOS began, the European Social Simulation Association (ESSA) and the Pacific Asian Association for Agent-Based Approach in Social Systems Science (PAAA), counterparts of NAACSOS, were organized. As of 2013, these three organizations collaborate internationally. The First World Congress on Social Simulation was held under their joint sponsorship in Kyoto, Japan, in August 2006. The Second World Congress was held in the northern Virginia suburbs of Washington, D.C., in July 2008, with George Mason University taking the lead role in local arrangements.

=== 2000s ===
More recently, Ron Sun developed methods for basing agent-based simulation on models of human cognition, known as cognitive social simulation. Bill McKelvey, Suzanne Lohmann, Dario Nardi, Dwight Read and others at UCLA have also made significant contributions in organizational behavior and decision-making. Since 1991, UCLA has arranged a conference at Lake Arrowhead, California, that has become another major gathering point for practitioners in this field.

=== 2020 and later ===
After the advent of large language models, researchers began applying interacting language models to agent based modeling. In one widely cited paper, agentic language models interacted in a sandbox environment to perform activities like planning birthday parties and holding elections.

== Theory ==
Most computational modeling research describes systems in equilibrium or as moving between equilibria. Agent-based modeling, however, using simple rules, can result in different sorts of complex and interesting behavior. The three ideas central to agent-based models are agents as objects, emergence, and complexity.

Agent-based models consist of dynamically interacting rule-based agents. The systems within which they interact can create real-world-like complexity. Typically agents are situated in space and time and reside in networks or in lattice-like neighborhoods. The location of the agents and their responsive behavior are encoded in algorithmic form in computer programs. In some cases, though not always, the agents may be considered as intelligent and purposeful. In ecological ABM (often referred to as "individual-based models" in ecology), agents may, for example, be trees in a forest, and would not be considered intelligent, although they may be "purposeful" in the sense of optimizing access to a resource (such as water). The modeling process is best described as inductive. The modeler makes those assumptions thought most relevant to the situation at hand and then watches phenomena emerge from the agents' interactions. Sometimes that result is an equilibrium. Sometimes it is an emergent pattern. Sometimes, however, it is an unintelligible mangle.

In some ways, agent-based models complement traditional analytic methods. Where analytic methods enable humans to characterize the equilibria of a system, agent-based models allow the possibility of generating those equilibria. This generative contribution may be the most mainstream of the potential benefits of agent-based modeling. Agent-based models can explain the emergence of higher-order patterns—network structures of terrorist organizations and the Internet, power-law distributions in the sizes of traffic jams, wars, and stock-market crashes, and social segregation that persists despite populations of tolerant people. Agent-based models also can be used to identify lever points, defined as moments in time in which interventions have extreme consequences, and to distinguish among types of path dependency.

Rather than focusing on stable states, many models consider a system's robustness—the ways that complex systems adapt to internal and external pressures so as to maintain their functionalities. The task of harnessing that complexity requires consideration of the agents themselves—their diversity, connectedness, and level of interactions.

=== Framework ===
Recent work on the Modeling and simulation of Complex Adaptive Systems has demonstrated the need for combining agent-based and complex network based models. describe a framework consisting of four levels of developing models of complex adaptive systems described using several example multidisciplinary case studies:

1. Complex Network Modeling Level for developing models using interaction data of various system components.
2. Exploratory Agent-based Modeling Level for developing agent-based models for assessing the feasibility of further research. This can e.g. be useful for developing proof-of-concept models such as for funding applications without requiring an extensive learning curve for the researchers.
3. Descriptive Agent-based Modeling (DREAM) for developing descriptions of agent-based models by means of using templates and complex network-based models. Building DREAM models allows model comparison across scientific disciplines.
4. Validated agent-based modeling using Virtual Overlay Multiagent system (VOMAS) for the development of verified and validated models in a formal manner.

Other methods of describing agent-based models include code templates and text-based methods such as the ODD (Overview, Design concepts, and Design Details) protocol.

The role of the environment where agents live, both macro and micro, is also becoming an important factor in agent-based modelling and simulation work. Simple environment affords simple agents, but complex environments generate diversity of behavior.

=== Multi-scale modelling ===
One strength of agent-based modelling is its ability to mediate information flow between scales. When additional details about an agent are needed, a researcher can integrate it with models describing the extra details. When one is interested in the emergent behaviours demonstrated by the agent population, they can combine the agent-based model with a continuum model describing population dynamics. For example, in a study about CD4+ T cells (a key cell type in the adaptive immune system), the researchers modelled biological phenomena occurring at different spatial (intracellular, cellular, and systemic), temporal, and organizational scales (signal transduction, gene regulation, metabolism, cellular behaviors, and cytokine transport). In the resulting modular model, signal transduction and gene regulation are described by a logical model, metabolism by constraint-based models, cell population dynamics are described by an agent-based model, and systemic cytokine concentrations by ordinary differential equations. In this multi-scale model, the agent-based model occupies the central place and orchestrates every stream of information flow between scales.

== Applications ==
=== In biology ===
Agent-based modeling has been used extensively in biology, including the analysis of the spread of epidemics, and the threat of biowarfare, biological applications including population dynamics, stochastic gene expression, plant-animal interactions, vegetation ecology, migratory ecology, impact assessments, landscape diversity, sociobiology, the growth and decline of ancient civilizations, evolution of ethnocentric behavior, forced displacement/migration, language choice dynamics, cognitive modeling, and biomedical applications including modeling 3D breast tissue formation/morphogenesis, the effects of ionizing radiation on mammary stem cell subpopulation dynamics, inflammation, and the human immune system, and the evolution of foraging behaviors. Agent-based models have also been used for developing decision support systems such as for breast cancer. Agent-based models are increasingly being used to model pharmacological systems in early stage and pre-clinical research to aid in drug development and gain insights into biological systems that would not be possible a priori. Military applications have also been evaluated. Moreover, agent-based models have been recently employed to study molecular-level biological systems. Agent-based models have also been written to describe ecological processes at work in ancient systems, such as those in dinosaur environments and more recent ancient systems as well.

=== In epidemiology ===
Agent-based models now complement traditional compartmental models, the usual type of epidemiological models. ABMs have been shown to be superior to compartmental models in regard to the accuracy of predictions. Recently, ABMs such as CovidSim by epidemiologist Neil Ferguson, have been used to inform public health (nonpharmaceutical) interventions against the spread of SARS-CoV-2. Epidemiological ABMs have been criticized for simplifying and unrealistic assumptions. Still, they can be useful in informing decisions regarding mitigation and suppression measures in cases when ABMs are accurately calibrated. The ABMs for such simulations are mostly based on synthetic populations, since the data of the actual population is not always available.

Examples of ABM use in epidemiology
Program	Year	Citation	Description
EpiCast	2021		Simulates the spread of disease throughout the population of the United States of America.
Covasim	2021		SEIR model implemented in Python with an emphasis on features for studying the effects of interventions.
OpenABM-Covid19	2021		Epidemic model of the spread of COVID-19, simulating every individual in a population with both R and Python interfaces but using C for heavy computation.
JUNE	2021		Epidemic model used in the UK named after June Almeida.
OpenCOVID	2021		An individual-based transmission model of SARS-CoV-2 infection and COVID-19 disease dynamics, developed at the Swiss Tropical and Public Health Institute.

=== In business, technology and network theory ===
Agent-based models have been used since the mid-1990s to solve a variety of business and technology problems. Examples of applications include marketing, organizational behaviour and cognition, team working, supply chain optimization and logistics, modeling of consumer behavior, including word of mouth, social network effects, distributed computing, workforce management, and portfolio management. They have also been used to analyze traffic congestion.

Recently, agent based modelling and simulation has been applied to various domains such as studying the impact of publication venues by researchers in the computer science domain (journals versus conferences). In addition, ABMs have been used to simulate information delivery in ambient assisted environments. A November 2016 article in arXiv analyzed an agent based simulation of posts spread in Facebook. In the domain of peer-to-peer, ad hoc and other self-organizing and complex networks, the usefulness of agent based modeling and simulation has been shown. The use of a computer science-based formal specification framework coupled with wireless sensor networks and an agent-based simulation has recently been demonstrated.

Agent based evolutionary search or algorithm is a new research topic for solving complex optimization problems.

=== In team science ===
In the realm of team science, agent-based modeling has been utilized to assess the effects of team members' characteristics and biases on team performance across various settings. By simulating interactions between agents—each representing individual team members with distinct traits and biases—this modeling approach enables researchers to explore how these factors collectively influence the dynamics and outcomes of team performance. Consequently, agent-based modeling provides a nuanced understanding of team science, facilitating a deeper exploration of the subtleties and variabilities inherent in team-based collaborations.

=== In economics and social sciences ===
Prior to, and during the 2008 financial crisis, interest has grown in ABMs as possible tools for economic analysis. ABMs do not assume the economy can achieve equilibrium and "representative agents" are replaced by agents with diverse, dynamic, and interdependent behavior including herding. ABMs take a "bottom-up" approach and can generate extremely complex and volatile simulated economies. ABMs can represent unstable systems with crashes and booms that develop out of non-linear (disproportionate) responses to proportionally small changes. A July 2010 article in The Economist looked at ABMs as alternatives to DSGE models. The journal Nature also encouraged agent-based modeling with an editorial that suggested ABMs can do a better job of representing financial markets and other economic complexities than standard models along with an essay by J. Doyne Farmer and Duncan Foley that argued ABMs could fulfill both the desires of Keynes to represent a complex economy and of Robert Lucas to construct models based on microfoundations. Farmer and Foley pointed to progress that has been made using ABMs to model parts of an economy, but argued for the creation of a very large model that incorporates low level models. By modeling a complex system of analysts based on three distinct behavioral profiles – imitating, anti-imitating, and indifferent – financial markets were simulated to high accuracy. Results showed a correlation between network morphology and the stock market index. However, the ABM approach has been criticized for its lack of robustness between models, where similar models can yield very different results.

ABMs have been deployed in architecture and urban planning to evaluate design and to simulate pedestrian flow in the urban environment and the examination of public policy applications to land-use. There is also a growing field of socio-economic analysis of infrastructure investment impact using ABM's ability to discern systemic impacts upon a socio-economic network. Heterogeneity and dynamics can be easily built in ABM models to address wealth inequality and social mobility.

ABMs have also been proposed as applied educational tools for diplomats in the field of international relations and for domestic and international policymakers to enhance their evaluation of public policy.

=== In water management ===
ABMs have also been applied in water resources planning and management, particularly for exploring, simulating, and predicting the performance of infrastructure design and policy decisions, and in assessing the value of cooperation and information exchange in large water resources systems.

=== Organizational ABM: agent-directed simulation ===
The agent-directed simulation (ADS) metaphor distinguishes between two categories, namely "Systems for Agents" and "Agents for Systems." Systems for Agents (sometimes referred to as agents systems) are systems implementing agents for the use in engineering, human and social dynamics, military applications, and others. Agents for Systems are divided in two subcategories. Agent-supported systems deal with the use of agents as a support facility to enable computer assistance in problem solving or enhancing cognitive capabilities. Agent-based systems focus on the use of agents for the generation of model behavior in a system evaluation (system studies and analyses).

=== Self-driving cars ===
Hallerbach et al. discussed the application of agent-based approaches for the development and validation of automated driving systems via a digital twin of the vehicle-under-test and microscopic traffic simulation based on independent agents. Waymo has created a multi-agent simulation environment Carcraft to test algorithms for self-driving cars. It simulates traffic interactions between human drivers, pedestrians and automated vehicles. People's behavior is imitated by artificial agents based on data of real human behavior. The basic idea of using agent-based modeling to understand self-driving cars was discussed as early as 2003.

== Implementation ==
Many ABM frameworks are designed for serial von-Neumann computer architectures, limiting the speed and scalability of implemented models. Since emergent behavior in large-scale ABMs is dependent of population size, scalability restrictions may hinder model validation. Such limitations have mainly been addressed using distributed computing, with frameworks such as Repast HPC specifically dedicated to these types of implementations. While such approaches map well to cluster and supercomputer architectures, issues related to communication and synchronization, as well as deployment complexity, remain potential obstacles for their widespread adoption.

A recent development is the use of data-parallel algorithms on Graphics Processing Units GPUs for ABM simulation. The extreme memory bandwidth combined with the sheer number crunching power of multi-processor GPUs has enabled simulation of millions of agents at tens of frames per second.

=== Integration with other modeling forms ===
Since Agent-Based Modeling is more of a modeling framework than a particular piece of software or platform, it has often been used in conjunction with other modeling forms. For instance, agent-based models have also been combined with Geographic Information Systems (GIS). This provides a useful combination where the ABM serves as a process model and the GIS system can provide a model of pattern. Similarly, Social Network Analysis (SNA) tools and agent-based models are sometimes integrated, where the ABM is used to simulate the dynamics on the network while the SNA tool models and analyzes the network of interactions. Tools like GAMA provide a natural way to integrate system dynamics and GIS with ABM.

== Verification and validation ==
Verification and validation (V&V) of simulation models is extremely important. Verification involves making sure the implemented model matches the conceptual model, whereas validation ensures that the implemented model has some relationship to the real-world. Face validation, sensitivity analysis, calibration, and statistical validation are different aspects of validation. A discrete-event simulation framework approach for the validation of agent-based systems has been proposed. A comprehensive resource on empirical validation of agent-based models can be found here.

As an example of V&V technique, consider VOMAS (virtual overlay multi-agent system), a software engineering based approach, where a virtual overlay multi-agent system is developed alongside the agent-based model. Muazi et al. also provide an example of using VOMAS for verification and validation of a forest fire simulation model. Another software engineering method, i.e. Test-Driven Development has been adapted to for agent-based model validation. This approach has another advantage that allows an automatic validation using unit test tools.

== See also ==
- Agent-based computational economics
- Agent-based model in biology
- Agent-based social simulation (ABSS)
- Artificial society
- Boids
- Comparison of agent-based modeling software
- Complex system
- Complex adaptive system
- Computational sociology
- Conway's Game of Life
- Dynamic network analysis
- Emergence
- Evolutionary algorithm
- Flocking
- Internet bot
- Kinetic exchange models of markets
- Multi-agent system
- Simulated reality
- Social complexity
- Social simulation
- Sociophysics
- Software agent
- Swarming behaviour
- Web-based simulation
- TOTREP
