= Kathleen Carley =

American social scientist (born 1956)

Kathleen Mary Carley
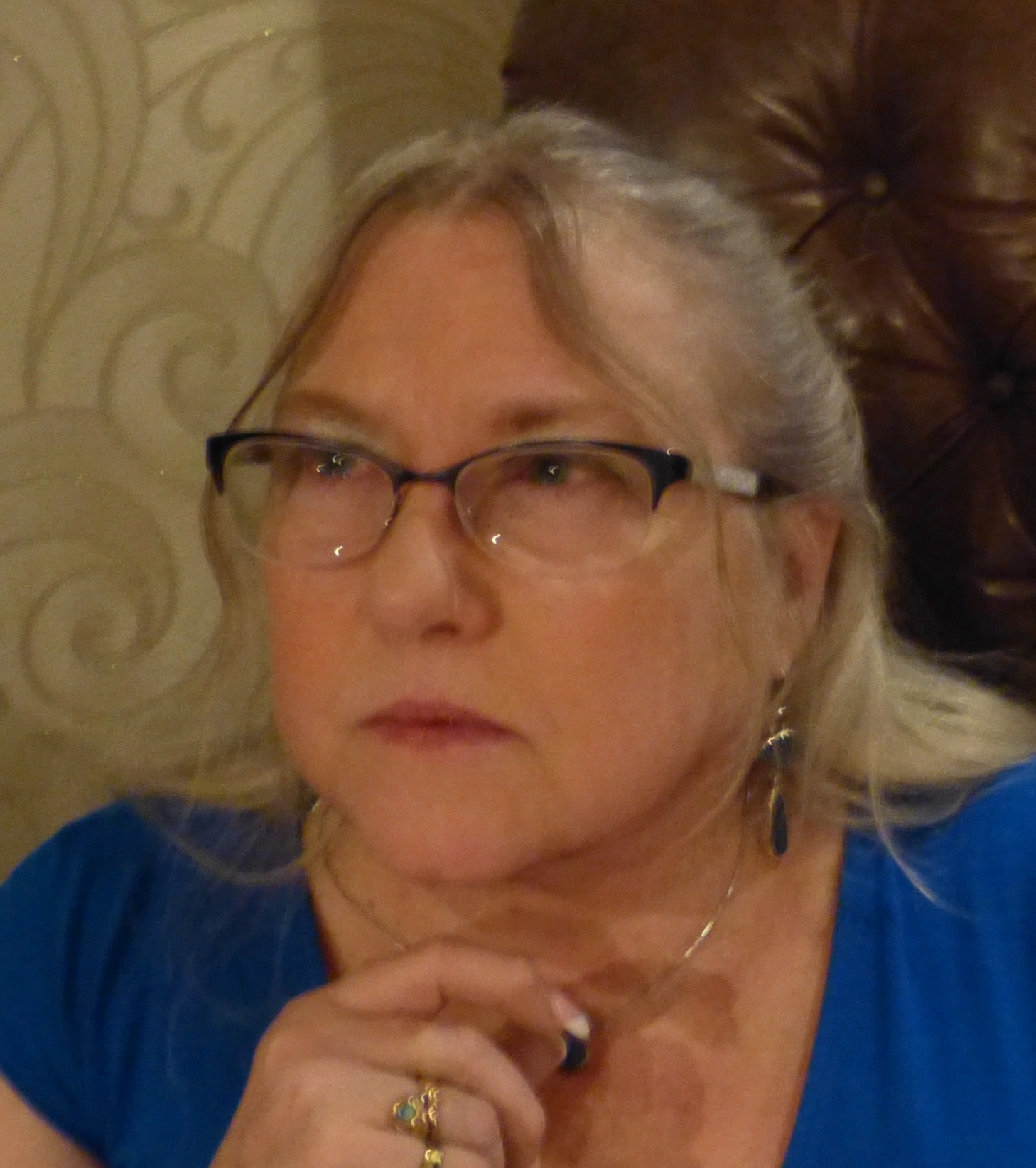
- Born: 1956 (age 69–70); Pueblo, Colorado
- Citizenship: American
- Education: Harvard University (1984); MIT (1978); University of Zurich (2019)
- Known for: Dynamic network analysis
- Scientific career
- Fields: Social network analysis Computational sociology Telecommunication policy Biosecurity
- Workplaces: Carnegie Mellon University
- Doctoral advisor: Harrison White

Kathleen M. Carley is an American computational social scientist specializing in dynamic network analysis. She is a professor in the School of Computer Science in the Carnegie Mellon Institute for Software Research at Carnegie Mellon University and also holds appointments in the Tepper School of Business, the Heinz College, the Department of Engineering and Public Policy, and the Department of Social and Decision Sciences.

== Background ==
Kathleen Carley was born in Pueblo, Colorado in 1956. At High School her interest in social modeling was inspired by Isaac Asimov's Foundation series. Artificial intelligence was not a career path at that time and she was dissuaded from studying Mathematics because of gender stereotyping. Instead she studied for an S.B. in economics and an S.B. in political science from the Massachusetts Institute of Technology in 1978. She received her Ph.D. in sociology from Harvard University in 1984. Her Ph.D. advisor was Harrison White and her thesis was entitled Consensus Construction.

== Career ==
On leaving Harvard in 1984, Carley secured a position as assistant professor of Sociology and Information Systems at Carnegie Mellon University where she remains based. In 1990 she became associate professor of Sociology and Organizations, in 1998 Professor of Sociology, Organizations and IT, and in 2002 attained her current role as Professor of Computation, Organization and Society. Since 1998 she has also held appointments in other CMU schools and departments; the Department of Social and Decision Sciences, Heinz College, Tepper School of Business and Department of Engineering and Public Policy.

== Research ==
Carley's research combines cognitive science, sociology and computer science to address complex social and organizational problems. Methodologically, she applies dynamic network analysis, machine learning (including large language models), natural language processing, and agent-based modeling to high-dimensional, large, and dynamic data. Application areas include information diffusion, opinion formation, organizational design, social cybersecurity, and synthetic data creation.

Carley is the founding co-editor and co-editor-in-chief of the journal Computational and Mathematical Organization Theory.

=== Her key publications include: ===
- Carley, Kathleen M. "A theory of group stability." American sociological review (1991): 331-354.
- Carley, Kathleen M. "Coding choices for textual analysis: A comparison of content analysis and map analysis." Sociological methodology (1993): 75-126.
- Carley, Kathleen M. "Extracting team mental models through textual analysis." Journal of Organizational Behavior: The International Journal of Industrial, Occupational and Organizational Psychology and Behavior 18, no. S1 (1997): 533-558.
- Carley, Kathleen M. "Computational organization science: A new frontier." Proceedings of the National Academy of Sciences 99, no. suppl_3 (2002): 7257-7262.
- Carley, Kathleen. "Organizational learning and personnel turnover." Organization science 3, no. 1 (1992): 20-46.
- Carley, Kathleen M. "Social cybersecurity: an emerging science." Computational and mathematical organization theory 26, no. 4 (2020): 365-381.
- Carley, Kathleen, and Allen Newell. "The nature of the social agent." Journal of mathematical sociology 19, no. 4 (1994): 221-262.
- Borgatti, Stephen P., Kathleen M. Carley, and David Krackhardt. "On the robustness of centrality measures under conditions of imperfect data." Social networks 28, no. 2 (2006): 124-136.
- Wu, Liang, Fred Morstatter, Kathleen M. Carley, and Huan Liu. "Misinformation in social media: definition, manipulation, and detection." ACM SIGKDD explorations newsletter 21, no. 2 (2019): 80-90.
- Carley, Kathleen M., and David S. Kaufer. "Semantic connectivity: An approach for analyzing symbols in semantic networks." Communication Theory 3, no. 3 (1993): 183-213.
- Carley, Kathleen M., Douglas B. Fridsma, Elizabeth Casman, Alex Yahja, Neal Altman, Li-Chiou Chen, Boris Kaminsky, and Démian Nave. "BioWar: scalable agent-based model of bioattacks." IEEE Transactions on Systems, Man, and Cybernetics-Part A: Systems and Humans 36, no. 2 (2006): 252-265.
- Lynnette Hui Xian Ng, Dawn Robertson, and Kathleen M. Carley, 2022, “Stabilizing a Supervised Bot Detection Algorithm: How Much Data is Needed for Consistent Predictions?” Online Social Networks and Media,
- Jeongkeun Shin, L. Richard Carley, and Kathleen M. Carley, 2024, “Simulation-Based Study on False Alarms in Intrusion Detection Systems for Organizations Facing Dual Phishing and DoS Attacks.” In 2024 Annual Modeling and Simulation Conference (ANNSIM),
- Evan M. Williams and Kathleen M. Carley, 2023, “Agent-Based Moral Interaction Simulations in Imbalanced Polarized Settings.” SBP-BRiMS Conference (September 2023),
- Charity Jacobs and Kathleen M. Carley, 2022 “#WhoDefinesDemocracy: Analysis on a 2021 Chinese Messaging Campaign.” SBP-BRiMS Conference (September 2022),
- Catherine King, Daniele Bellutta, and Kathleen M. Carley, 2020, “Lying About Lying on Social Media: A Case Study of the 2019 Canadian Elections,” In Proceedings of the International Conference SBP-BRiMS 2020, Halil Bisgin, Ayaz Hyder, Chris Dancy, and Robert Thomson (Eds.) Washington DC, October 2020, Springer.

=== Her key books include: ===
- Lynnette Ng and Kathleen M. Carley, 2026, Bots, Bias and Influence: The Hidden Architects of Social Media, Cambridge Publishing
- Il-Chul Moon, Kathleen M. Carley, T.G. Kim. 2013, Modeling and Simulating Command and Control for Organizations under Extreme Situations. Springer.
- Zhiang Lin and Kathleen M. Carley, 2003, Designing Stress Resistant Organizations: Computational Theorizing and Crisis Applications, Boston, MA: Kluwer.
- Michael J. Prietula, Kathleen M. Carley and Les Gasser (Eds.), 1998, Simulating Organizations: Computational Models of Institutions and Groups, Menlo Park, CA: AAAI Press / The MIT Press.
- Robert W. Lawler and Kathleen M. Carley, 1996, Advanced Qualitative Methods in the Study of Human Behavior: Case Study and Computing, Norwood, NJ: Ablex.
- Kathleen M. Carley and Michael J. Prietula (Eds.), 1994, Computational Organization Theory, Hillsdale, NJ: Lawrence Erlbaum Associates.
- David S. Kaufer and Kathleen M. Carley, 1993, Communication at a Distance: The Effect of Print on Socio-Cultural Organization and Change, Hillsdale, NJ: Lawrence Erlbaum Associates.

== See also ==
- Dynamic network analysis
