= Dynamic network analysis =

Emergent scientific field in sociology and statistics

Dynamic network analysis (DNA) is an emergent scientific field that brings together traditional social network analysis (SNA), link analysis (LA), social simulation and multi-agent systems (MAS) within network science and network theory. Dynamic networks are a function of time (modeled as a subset of the real numbers) to a set of graphs; for each time point there is a graph. This is akin to the definition of dynamical systems, in which the function is from time to an ambient space, where instead of ambient space time is translated to relationships between pairs of vertices.

== Overview ==
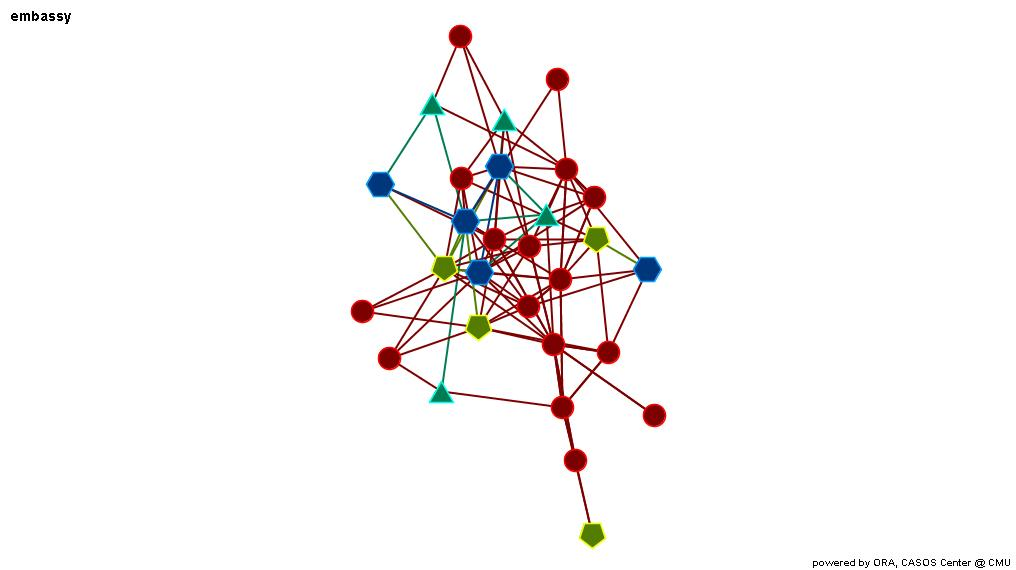
An example of a multi-entity, multi-network, dynamic network diagram

There are two aspects of this field. The first is the statistical analysis of DNA data. The second is the utilization of simulation to address issues of network dynamics. DNA networks vary from traditional social networks in that they are larger, dynamic, multi-mode, multi-plex networks, and may contain varying levels of uncertainty. The main difference of DNA to SNA is that DNA takes interactions of social features conditioning structure and behavior of networks into account. DNA is tied to temporal analysis but temporal analysis is not necessarily tied to DNA, as changes in networks sometimes result from external factors which are independent of social features found in networks. One of the most notable and earliest of cases in the use of DNA is in Sampson's monastery study, where he took snapshots of the same network from different intervals and observed and analyzed the evolution of the network.

DNA statistical tools are generally optimized for large-scale networks and admit the analysis of multiple networks simultaneously in which, there are multiple types of nodes (multi-node) and multiple types of links (multi-plex). Multi-node multi-plex networks are generally referred to as meta-networks or high-dimensional networks. In contrast, SNA statistical tools focus on single or at most two mode data and facilitate the analysis of only one type of link at a time.

DNA statistical tools tend to provide more measures to the user, because they have measures that use data drawn from multiple networks simultaneously. Latent space models (Sarkar and Moore, 2005) and agent-based simulation are often used to examine dynamic social networks (Carley et al., 2009). From a computer simulation perspective, nodes in DNA are like atoms in quantum theory, nodes can be, though need not be, treated as probabilistic. Whereas nodes in a traditional SNA model are static, nodes in a DNA model have the ability to learn. Properties change over time; nodes can adapt: A company's employees can learn new skills and increase their value to the network; or, capture one terrorist and three more are forced to improvise. Change propagates from one node to the next and so on. DNA adds the element of a network's evolution and considers the circumstances under which change is likely to occur.

There are three main features to dynamic network analysis that distinguish it from standard social network analysis. First, rather than just using social networks, DNA looks at meta-networks. Second, agent-based modeling and other forms of simulations are often used to explore how networks evolve and adapt as well as the impact of interventions on those networks. Third, the links in the network are not binary; in fact, in many cases they represent the probability that there is a link.

== Dynamic Representation Learning ==
Complex information about object relationships can be effectively condensed into low-dimensional embeddings in a latent space. Dynamic systems, unlike static ones, involve temporal changes. Differences in learned representations over time in a dynamic system can arise from actual changes or arbitrary alterations that do not affect the metrics in the latent space with the former reflecting on the system's stability and the latter linked to the alignment of embeddings.

In essence, the stability of the system defines its dynamics, while misalignment signifies irrelevant changes in the latent space. Dynamic embeddings are considered aligned when variations between embeddings at different times accurately represent the system's actual changes, not meaningless alterations in the latent space. The matter of stability and alignment of dynamic embeddings holds significant importance in various tasks reliant on temporal changes within the latent space. These tasks encompass future metadata prediction, temporal evolution, dynamic visualization, and obtaining average embeddings, among others.

== Meta-network ==
A meta-network is a multi-mode, multi-link, multi-level network. Multi-mode means that there are many types of nodes; e.g., nodes people and locations. Multi-link means that there are many types of links; e.g., friendship and advice. Multi-level means that some nodes may be members of other nodes, such as a network composed of people and organizations and one of the links is who is a member of which organization.

While different researchers use different modes, common modes reflect who, what, when, where, why and how. A simple example of a meta-network is the PCANS formulation with people, tasks, and resources. A more detailed formulation considers people, tasks, resources, knowledge, and organizations. The ORA tool was developed to support meta-network analysis.

== Illustrative problems that people in the DNA area work on ==
- Developing metrics and statistics to assess and identify change within and across networks.
- Developing and validating simulations to study network change, evolution, adaptation, decay. See Computer simulation and organizational studies
- Developing and testing theory of network change, evolution, adaptation, decay
- Developing and validating formal models of network generation and evolution
- Developing techniques to visualize network change overall or at the node or group level
- Developing statistical techniques to see whether differences observed over time in networks are due to simply different samples from a distribution of links and nodes or changes over time in the underlying distribution of links and nodes
- Developing control processes for networks over time
- Developing algorithms to change distributions of links in networks over time
- Developing algorithms to track groups in networks over time
- Developing tools to extract or locate networks from various data sources such as texts
- Developing statistically valid measurements on networks over time
- Examining the robustness of network metrics under various types of missing data
- Empirical studies of multi-mode multi-link multi-time period networks
- Examining networks as probabilistic time-variant phenomena
- Forecasting change in existing networks
- Identifying trails through time given a sequence of networks
- Identifying changes in node criticality given a sequence of networks anything else related to multi-mode multi-link multi-time period networks
- Studying random walks on temporal networks
- Quantifying structural properties of contact sequences in dynamic networks, which influence dynamical processes
- Assessment of covert activity and dark networks
- Citational analysis
- Social media analysis
- Assessment of public health systems
- Analysis of hospital safety outcomes
- Assessment of the structure of ethnic violence from news data
- Assessment of terror groups
- Online social decay of social interactions
- Modelling of classroom interactions in schools

== See also ==
- Graph dynamical system
- International Network for Social Network Analysis
- Kathleen M. Carley
- Network dynamics
- Network science
- Sequential dynamical systemios13.3 deca mield(8)
