= Repast (modeling toolkit) =

The Recursive Porous Agent Simulation Toolkit (Repast) is a widely used free and open-source, cross-platform, agent-based modeling and simulation toolkit. Repast has multiple implementations in several languages (North, Collier & Vos 2006) and built-in adaptive features, such as genetic algorithms and regression.

Repast was originally developed by David Sallach, Nick Collier, Tom Howe, Michael North and others at the University of Chicago.

== Features ==
- variety of agents and examples
- fully object oriented
- fully concurrent discrete event scheduler
- built-in simulation results logging and graphing tools (North et al. 2007)
- allows users to dynamically access and modify agents and model at run time
- libraries for genetic algorithms, neural networks, etc.
- built-in systems dynamics modeling
- social network modeling tools
- integrated geographical information systems (GIS) support
- implemented in Java, C#, etc.
- supports Java, C#, Managed C++, Visual Basic.Net, Managed Lisp, Managed Prolog, and Python scripting, etc.
- is available on virtually all modern computing platforms

== See also ==
- Agent-based social simulation
- NetLogo
- Sugarscape
- Swarm
