= Journal of Artificial Societies and Social Simulation =

- Discipline: Social sciences
- Language: English
- Edited by: Flaminio Squazzoni

Publication details
- History: 1998–present
- Publisher: SimSoc Consortium (United Kingdom)
- Frequency: Quarterly
- Open access: Yes
- Impact factor: 2.194 (2018)

Standard abbreviations
- ISO 4: J. Artif. Soc. Soc. Simul.

Indexing
- ISSN: 1460-7425
- LCCN: sn99038011

Links
- Journal homepage

The Journal of Artificial Societies and Social Simulation (JASSS) is a quarterly peer-reviewed academic journal created by Nigel Gilbert (University of Surrey). The current editor is Flaminio Squazzoni. The journal publishes articles in computational sociology, social simulation, complexity science, and artificial societies. Its approach is multi-disciplinary, integrating sociology, economy, computer science, or physics. The journal is published open access.
