= William L. Burke =

Astronomy, astrophysics, and physics professor (1941–1996)

William Lionel Burke
- Born: July 5, 1941; Bennington, Vermont, U.S.
- Died: July 22, 1996 (aged 55)
- Education: Caltech
- Scientific career
- Workplaces: University of California, Santa Cruz

William Lionel Burke (July 1941 – July 1996) was an astronomy, astrophysics, and physics professor at UC Santa Cruz. He is also the author of Spacetime, Geometry, Cosmology (ISBN 0-935702-01-6) (out of print but recently scanned into the Internet Archive), and of Applied differential geometry (ISBN 0-521-26929-6), a text expounding the virtues of differential forms over vector calculus for theoretical physics. Bill also has a draft of a 3rd book reachable on the web |Div, Grad, Curl are Dead].

Born in Bennington, Vermont, Burke obtained his Bachelor of Science degree from Caltech in 1963. His 1969 doctoral thesis, also at Caltech and supervised by Richard Feynman (chair), John Wheeler and Kip Thorne (3rd PhD student), was entitled The Coupling of Gravitational Radiation to Nonrelativistic Sources. His discovery of the Burke Potential, an aspect of gravitation overlooked by Einstein himself, dates from this period. He became a full professor at UCSC in 1988.

Burke is also known as the godfather of the Santa Cruz "Chaos Cabal" also known as the dynamical systems collective, that nurtured the seminal work of MacArthur Fellow Robert Shaw, Norman Packard, Doyne Farmer and James P. Crutchfield. In Tom Bass' book The Eudaemonic Pie, Burke prided himself for his Rubik's Cube costume at the end of the book which kept his identity concealed from his students.

Among other Burke PhD students was astronaut Steven Hawley who was briefly married to astronaut Sally Ride.

An avid hiker, climber, skier, sailor, wind surfer, and Go player, Bill Burke died from complications due to a cervical fracture sustained in an automobile accident. Bill's understanding of science is paraphrased by his thinking: "Never descend the Grand Canyon with less than two geologists."

Bill was married and then divorced from his wife Pat (Patricia).

== See also ==
- Tom Bass, The Eudaemonic Pie
- James Gleick, Chaos: Making a New Science
