= Edge of chaos =

Transition space between order and disorder

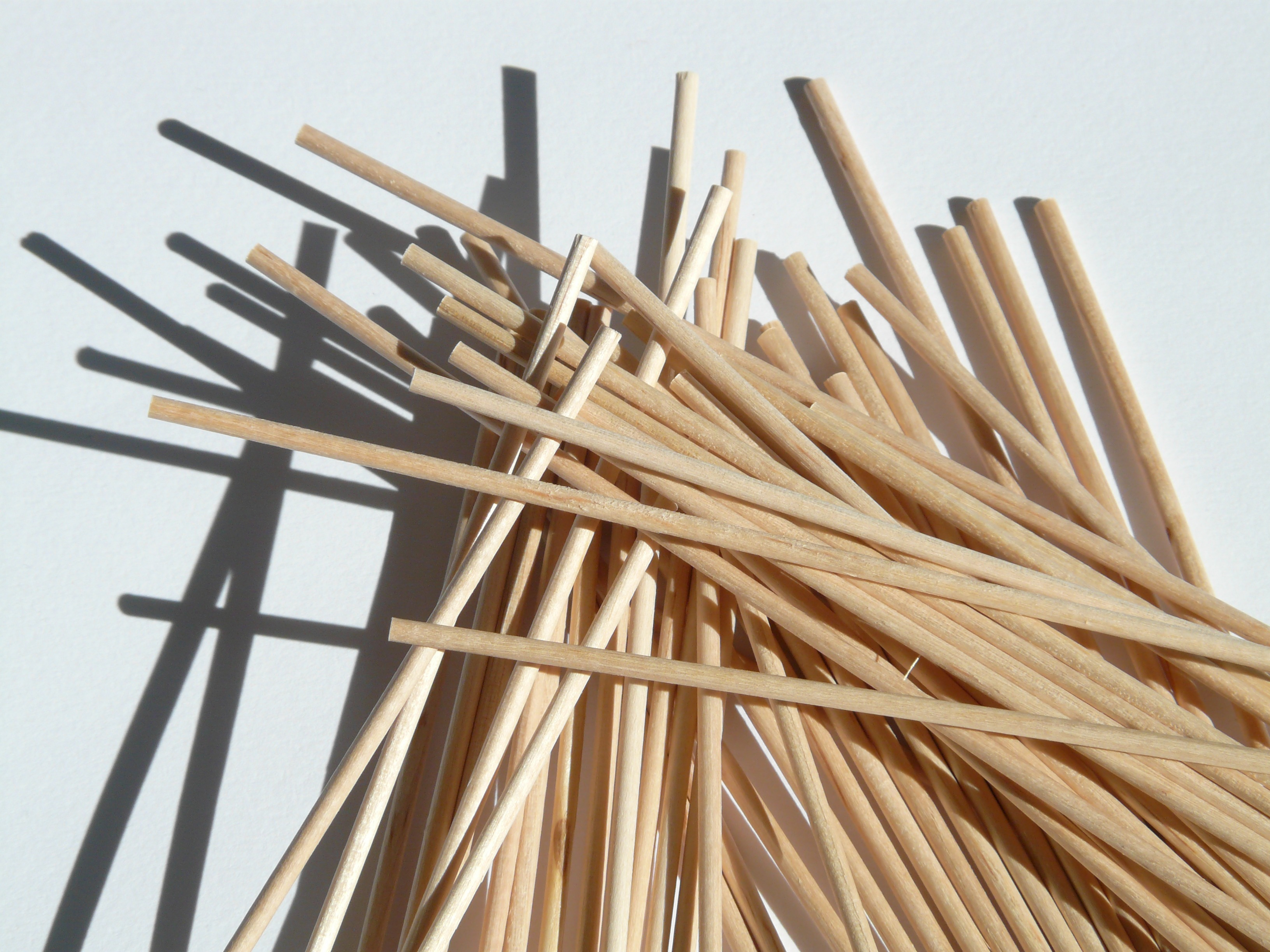
- "The truly creative changes and the big shifts occur right at the edge of chaos." — Dr. Robert Bilder, Professor at the UCLA Semel Institute for Neuroscience and Human Behavior

The edge of chaos is a transition space between order and disorder that is hypothesized to exist within a wide variety of systems. This transition zone is a region of bounded instability that engenders a constant dynamic interplay between order and disorder.

Even though the idea of the edge of chaos is an abstract one, it has many applications in such fields as ecology, business management, psychology, political science, and other domains of the social sciences. Physicists have shown that adaptation to the edge of chaos occurs in almost all systems with feedback.

== History ==
The phrase edge of chaos was coined in the late 1980s by chaos theory physicist Norman Packard. In the next decade, Packard and mathematician Doyne Farmer co-authored many papers on understanding how self-organization and order emerges at the edge of chaos. One of the original catalysts that led to the idea of the edge of chaos were the experiments with cellular automata done by computer scientist Christopher Langton where a transition phenomenon was discovered. The phrase refers to an area in the range of a variable, λ (lambda), which was varied while examining the behaviour of a cellular automaton (CA). As λ varied, the behaviour of the CA went through a phase transition of behaviours. Langton found a small area conducive to produce CAs capable of universal computation. At around the same time physicist James P. Crutchfield and others used the phrase onset of chaos to describe more or less the same concept.

In the sciences in general, the phrase has come to refer to a metaphor that some physical, biological, economic and social systems operate in a region between order and either complete randomness or chaos, where the complexity is maximal. The generality and significance of the idea, however, has since been called into question by Melanie Mitchell and others.

Stuart Kauffman has studied mathematical models of evolving systems in which the rate of evolution is maximized near the edge of chaos.

== Adaptation ==
Adaptation plays a vital role for all living organisms and systems. All of them are constantly changing their inner properties to better fit in the current environment. The most important instruments for the adaptation are the self-adjusting parameters inherent for many natural systems. The prominent feature of systems with self-adjusting parameters is an ability to avoid chaos. The name for this phenomenon is "Adaptation to the edge of chaos".

Adaptation to the edge of chaos refers to the idea that many complex adaptive systems (CASs) seem to intuitively evolve toward a regime near the boundary between chaos and order. Physics has shown that edge of chaos is the optimal settings for control of a system. It is also an optional setting that can influence the ability of a physical system to perform primitive functions for computation. In CAS, coevolution generally occurs near the edge of chaos, and a balance should be maintained between flexibility and stability to avoid structural failure. As a response to coping with turbulent environments, CAS bring out flexibility, creativity, agility, anti-fragility, and innovation near the edge of chaos, provided these systems are sufficiently decentralized and non-hierarchical.

Because of the importance of adaptation in many natural systems, adaptation to the edge of the chaos takes a prominent position in many scientific researches. Physicists demonstrated that adaptation to state at the boundary of chaos and order occurs in population of cellular automata rules which optimize the performance evolving with a genetic algorithm. Another example of this phenomenon is the self-organized criticality in avalanche and earthquake models.

The simplest model for chaotic dynamics is the logistic map. Self-adjusting logistic map dynamics exhibit adaptation to the edge of chaos. Theoretical analysis allowed prediction of the location of the narrow parameter regime near the boundary to which the system evolves.

== See also ==
- Chaos theory
- Complexity theory and organizations
- Self-organized criticality
- Kaleidoscope
