= Eudaemons =

1970s American roulette research group

The Eudaemons were a small group headed by graduate physics students J. Doyne Farmer and Norman Packard at the University of California Santa Cruz in the late 1970s. The group's immediate objective was to find a way to beat roulette using a concealed computer, with the ulterior motive of using the money made from roulette to fund a scientific community. The name of the group was inspired by the eudaimonism philosophy.

== History ==
One summer, the two students began using scientific instruments to conduct research on a roulette wheel which they had bought. With a camera and an oscilloscope, they tracked the motion of the roulette wheel and were able to figure out a formula involving trigonometric functions and four variables. The period of rotation of the roulette wheel and the period of rotation of the ball around the roulette wheel were among the four variables.

Using a computer that they had built, they were able to predict which of the roulette's wheel's octants the ball would fall on. The computer was designed to be invisible to an onlooker and was small enough to fit inside a shoe. Data was inputted by tapping the big toe on a micro-switch in the shoe. An electronic signal was then relayed to a vibrotactile output system strapped to the chest, which had three solenoid actuators near the stomach to indicate which of the eight octants of the roulette wheel to place a bet on, or a ninth possibility: not to place a bet.

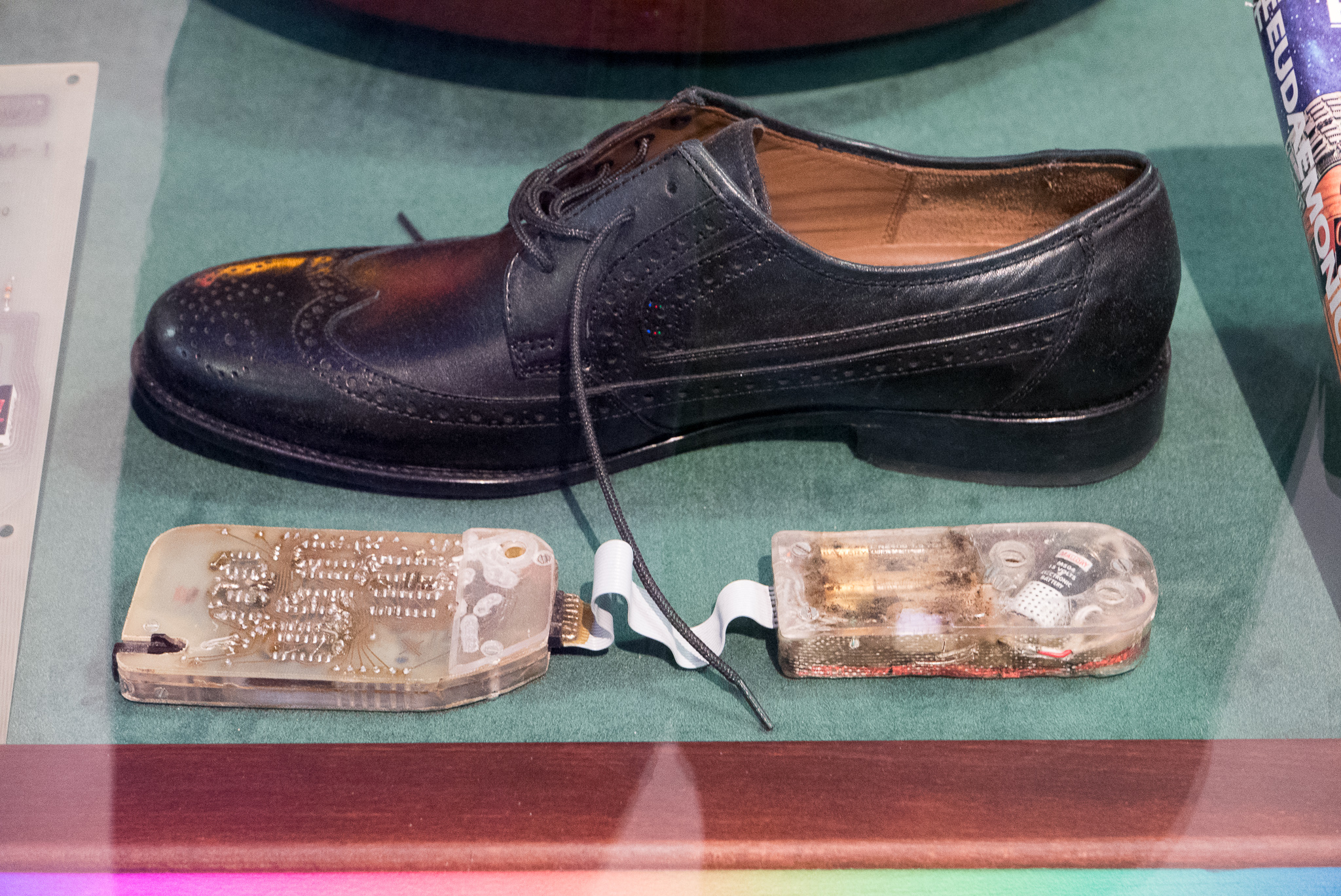
The Eudaemons' shoe computer on display at the Heinz Nixdorf MuseumsForum

It took two years to develop the computerized system. By 1978, it was working and the group went to Las Vegas to make money at it. Eventually the system was split between two persons: an observer and a bettor. The observer would tap input signals with the foot, the bettor would receive output signals underneath their shirt. The average profit was 44% for every dollar. However, there were problems: in one case the insulation failed and the bettor received electric shocks from the solenoids. But she kept placing bets, so the observer, who in this case was Farmer, left the table, so that the bettor would be forced to leave as well. Afterwards it turned out that the solenoid had burned a hole into her skin. Some members of the group had already left because of trouble juggling the academic schedule with the Eudaemons, but the burning incident caused the two leaders to disband the group. Collectively they had managed to make about $10,000.

As a science experiment, the group's objective was accomplished: to prove that there was a way of predicting where a ball would fall in a roulette wheel given input data about the timing of the passage of the ball relative to the wheel.

A previous wearable roulette computer had been built and used in a casino by Edward O. Thorp and Claude Shannon in 1960–1961, though it had only been used briefly.

== Adaptations ==
The Eudaemon's scheme is used in the CSI: Crime Scene Investigation episode "No More Bets" of 2004.

== Sources ==
The Eudaemons were the feature of the 1985 book The Eudaemonic Pie by Thomas A Bass; the British version of this book was titled The Newtonian Casino.

The story of the Eudaemons was featured in 2004 on the History Channel, in episode "Beat the Wheel" of the Breaking Vegas program.

== See also ==
- Chaos: Making a New Science
- Determinism
- Laplace's demon
- Robert Shaw (physicist)
- Data science
- MIT Blackjack Team
