= Robert Shaw (physicist) =

American physicist (born 1946)

Robert Stetson Shaw (born 1946) is an American physicist who was part of Eudaemonic Enterprises in Santa Cruz in the late 1970s and early 1980s. In 1988 he was awarded a MacArthur Fellowship for his work in chaos theory.

== Chaos theory ==
Shaw was one of the pioneers of chaos theory and his work at University of California, Santa Cruz on the subject was among the first research into the relationship between predictable motion and chaos in a landmark PhD thesis.

He was part of the Dynamical Systems Collective with J. Doyne Farmer, Norman Packard, and James Crutchfield. The collective, also known as the Santa Cruz Chaos Cabal, was best known for its work in probing chaotic systems for signs of order.

A documentary is being made about Shaw's life, his art, and his science, titled Strange Attractors: a movie for curious people.

== Roulette ==
While at the University of California, Santa Cruz, Shaw also worked briefly with the Eudaemons, a group of physicists attempting to create a computer capable of predicting the outcome of a game of roulette.

== Illustrations ==
Shaw's younger brother, Chris, an artist and filmmaker, produced illustrations for Shaw's papers and thesis, and also for those of Shaw's PhD advisers Ralph Abraham and William Burke. One cosmological painting of consecutive universes exploding and imploding in alternating Big Bangs and Big Crunches in Burke's cosmology textbook hangs on a wall at the American Center for Physics.
