= En prison =

Roulette bet

In roulette, the en prison rule is an opportunity to recover one's stakes after a spin of zero, provided one's bet was even-odds (i.e. high–low, even–odd, red–black). It is a variant of the la partage rule, in which a player loses only half their even-odds stake if the original spin is a zero, recouping the other half (partage being French for "sharing"). In European casinos, where la partage is customary, the player may be given the option instead to place their original stake en prison ("in prison" in French). The stake is left on the previous bet, and the croupier places a marker on it to show it is en prison. If the bet wins on the next spin, the player's stake is returned; if it loses, it is forfeited. Different casinos adopt different rules for the case where zero comes up a second time: it may be treated as won, lost, la partage or en prison.

The 'La Partage' version of Roulette is more favorable towards the player when compared to the standard American and European Roulette Games. It has a payout percentage of 98.65%, which means the house edge is 1.35%, but this is only the case when the player is betting on a two-sided outside bet.

Most Casinos in the United States do not use la partage or en prison rules; an even-odds stake loses if zero is rolled. Those that do include these Las Vegas Casinos: The Bellagio, MGM Grand, The Mirage, The Rio and The Wynn.

At some casinos, there is a further twist to the En Prison rule: a "second spin zero" rule. If the ball lands in the zero again (so twice in a row), the bet remains "en prison".

== See also ==
- Double or nothing
