= Laplace's demon =

Hypothetical all-predicting intellect

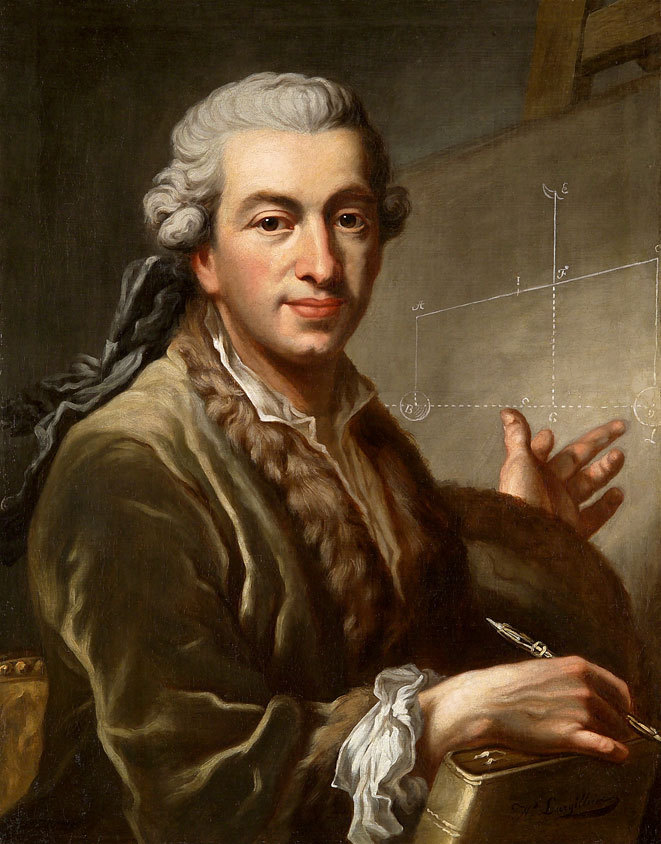
French scholar Pierre-Simon de Laplace (1749–1827)

In the history of science, Laplace's demon was a notable articulation of the idea of scientific causal determinism, published in 1814 by Pierre-Simon Laplace. According to determinism, if someone (the demon) knows the precise location and momentum of every particle in the universe, their past and future values for any given time are entailed, and can be calculated from the laws of classical mechanics.

== English translation ==
We may regard the present state of the universe as the effect of its past and the cause of its future. An intellect which at a certain moment would know all forces that set nature in motion, and all positions of all items of which nature is composed, if this intellect were also vast enough to submit these data to analysis, it would embrace in a single formula the movements of the greatest bodies of the universe and those of the tiniest atom; for such an intellect nothing would be uncertain and the future just like the past could be present before its eyes.

— Pierre Simon Laplace, A Philosophical Essay on Probabilities

This intellect is often referred to as Laplace's demon (and sometimes Laplace's Superman, after Hans Reichenbach). Laplace himself did not use the word "demon", which was a later embellishment. As translated into English above, he simply referred to: "Une intelligence ... Rien ne serait incertain pour elle, et l'avenir, comme le passé, serait présent à ses yeux." This idea seems to have been widespread around the time that Laplace first expressed it in 1773, particularly in France. Variations can be found in Maupertuis (1756), Nicolas de Condorcet (1768), Baron D'Holbach (1770), and an undated fragment in the archives of Diderot. Recent scholarship suggests that the image of a super-powerful calculating intelligence was also proposed by Roger Joseph Boscovich in his 1758 Theoria philosophiae naturalis.

== Arguments against Laplace's demon ==
=== Thermodynamic irreversibility ===
According to chemical engineer Robert Ulanowicz's Growth and Development (1986), Laplace's demon met its end with early 19th century developments of the concepts of irreversibility, entropy, and the second law of thermodynamics. In other words, Laplace's demon was based on the premise of reversibility and classical mechanics; however, Ulanowicz points out that many thermodynamic processes are irreversible, so that if thermodynamic quantities are taken to be purely physical then no such demon is possible as one could not reconstruct past positions and momenta from the current state.

Maximum entropy thermodynamics takes a very different view, considering thermodynamic variables to have a statistical basis which is separate from the deterministic microscopic physics. However, this theory has met criticism regarding its ability to make predictions about physics; a number of physicists and mathematicians, including Yvan Velenik of the Department of Mathematics for the University of Geneva, have pointed out that maximum entropy thermodynamics essentially describes our knowledge about a system but does not describe the system itself.

=== Quantum mechanical irreversibility ===
Due to its canonical assumption of determinism, Laplace's demon is incompatible with the Copenhagen interpretation, which stipulates indeterminacy. The interpretation of quantum mechanics is still very much open for debate and there are many who take opposing views (such as the many worlds interpretation and the de Broglie–Bohm interpretation).

=== Chaos theory ===
Chaos theory has been pointed out as contradicting to Laplace's demon: it describes how a deterministic system can nonetheless exhibit behavior that is impossible to predict: as in the butterfly effect, minor variations between the starting conditions of two systems can result in major differences. While this explains unpredictability in practical cases, applying it to Laplace's case is questionable: under the strict demon hypothesis all details are known—to infinite precision—and therefore variations in starting conditions are non-existent.

=== Cantor diagonalization ===
In 2008, David Wolpert used Cantor diagonalization to challenge the idea of Laplace's demon. He did this by assuming that the demon is a computational device and showed that no two such devices can completely predict each other. Wolpert's paper was cited in 2014 in a paper of Josef Rukavicka, where a significantly simpler argument is presented that disproves Laplace's demon using Turing machines, under the assumption of free will.

== Additional context ==
In full context, Laplace's demon, as conceived, is infinitely removed from the human mind and thus could never assist humanity's efforts at prediction:

All these efforts in the search for truth tend to lead [the human mind] back continually to the vast intelligence which we have just mentioned, but from which it will always remain infinitely removed.

— Pierre Simon Laplace, A Philosophical Essay on Probabilities

Despite this, the English physicist Stephen Hawking said in his book A Brief History of Time that "Laplace suggested that there should be a set of scientific laws that would allow us to predict everything that would happen in the universe."

Similarly, in James Gleick's book Chaos, the author appears to conflate Laplace's demon with a "dream" for human deterministic predictability, and even states that "Laplace seems almost buffoon-like in his optimism, but much of modern science has pursued his dream" (pg.14).

== Loschmidt's paradox ==
Recently, Laplace's demon has been invoked to resolve a famous paradox of statistical physics, Loschmidt's paradox. The argument is that, in order to reverse all velocities in a gas system, measurements must be performed by what effectively becomes a Laplace's demon. This, in conjunction with Landauer's principle, allows a way out of the paradox.

== Recent views ==
Modern studies have proposed limits on the computational power of the universe, which would preclude the ability of Laplace's demon to process an infinite amount of information. A paper by Seth Lloyd in 2000 proposed a limit based on the maximum entropy of the universe, the speed of light, and the minimum amount of time taken to move information across the Planck length, arriving at a figure of around 10^{120} bits. Accordingly, anything that requires more than this amount of data cannot be computed in the amount of time that has elapsed so far in the universe. A simple logical proof of the impossibility of Laplace's idea was advanced in 2012 by Iegor Reznikoff, who posits that the demon cannot predict his own future memory.

== See also ==
- Clockwork universe theory
- Eudaemons
- Evil demon
- Laplace's Witch (film)
- Laplace's Angel (song)
- Maxwell's demon
- Omniscience
- Superdeterminism
- Thought experiment
