= Prediction Company =

American financial forecasting company

Prediction Company was founded in Santa Fe, New Mexico, USA, in March 1991 by J. Doyne Farmer, Norman Packard, and James McGill. The company used forecasting techniques to build black-box trading systems for financial markets, mainly employing statistical learning theory. In September 1992, Prediction Company entered into an exclusive contract with O'Connor and Associates, a Chicago derivatives trading house, to provide investment advice and technology. Soon after O'Connor merged with Swiss Bank Corporation, which later merged with Union Bank of Switzerland (UBS). Prediction Company's contract was renewed multiple times and in 2005 UBS purchased Prediction Company outright. After being a wholly owned subsidiary of UBS, Prediction Company was acquired in 2013 by an affiliate of Millennium Partners, L.P.

Prediction Company was shut down on September 1, 2018. In twenty-six years of operation, Prediction Company had only one losing year, 2007.

== See also ==
- BiosGroup
