= The Eudaemonic Pie =

1985 non-fiction book by Thomas A. Bass

- Softcover edition
- Author: Thomas A. Bass
- Language: English
- Subject: Gambling
- Genre: Non-fiction
- Publisher: Houghton Mifflin
- Publication date: April 1985
- Publication place: United States
- Media type: Print, e-book
- Pages: 324 pp.
- ISBN: 978-0395353356
- Followed by: The Predictors

The Eudaemonic Pie is a non-fiction book about gambling by American author Thomas A. Bass. The book was initially published in April 1985 by Houghton Mifflin.

== Overview ==
The book focuses on a group of University of California, Santa Cruz, physics graduate students (known as the Eudaemons) who in the late 1970s and early 1980s designed and employed miniaturized computers, hidden in specially modified platform soled shoes, to help predict the outcome of casino roulette games. The players knew, presumably from the earlier work of Shannon and Thorp, that by capturing the state of the ball and wheel and taking into account peculiarities of the particular wheels being played they could increase their odds of selecting a winning number to gain a 44 percent advantage over the casinos.

== British edition ==
A British edition was published under the title The Newtonian Casino.

== Sequel ==
The major players in The Eudaemonic Pie are also featured in a sequel by the same author, The Predictors, about their subsequent careers in the world of finance.

== See also ==
Similarly themed books include:

- Bringing Down the House (2002)
- Busting Vegas (2005)
- Straight Flush (2013)
