= James P. Crutchfield =

American physicist and mathematician (born 1955)

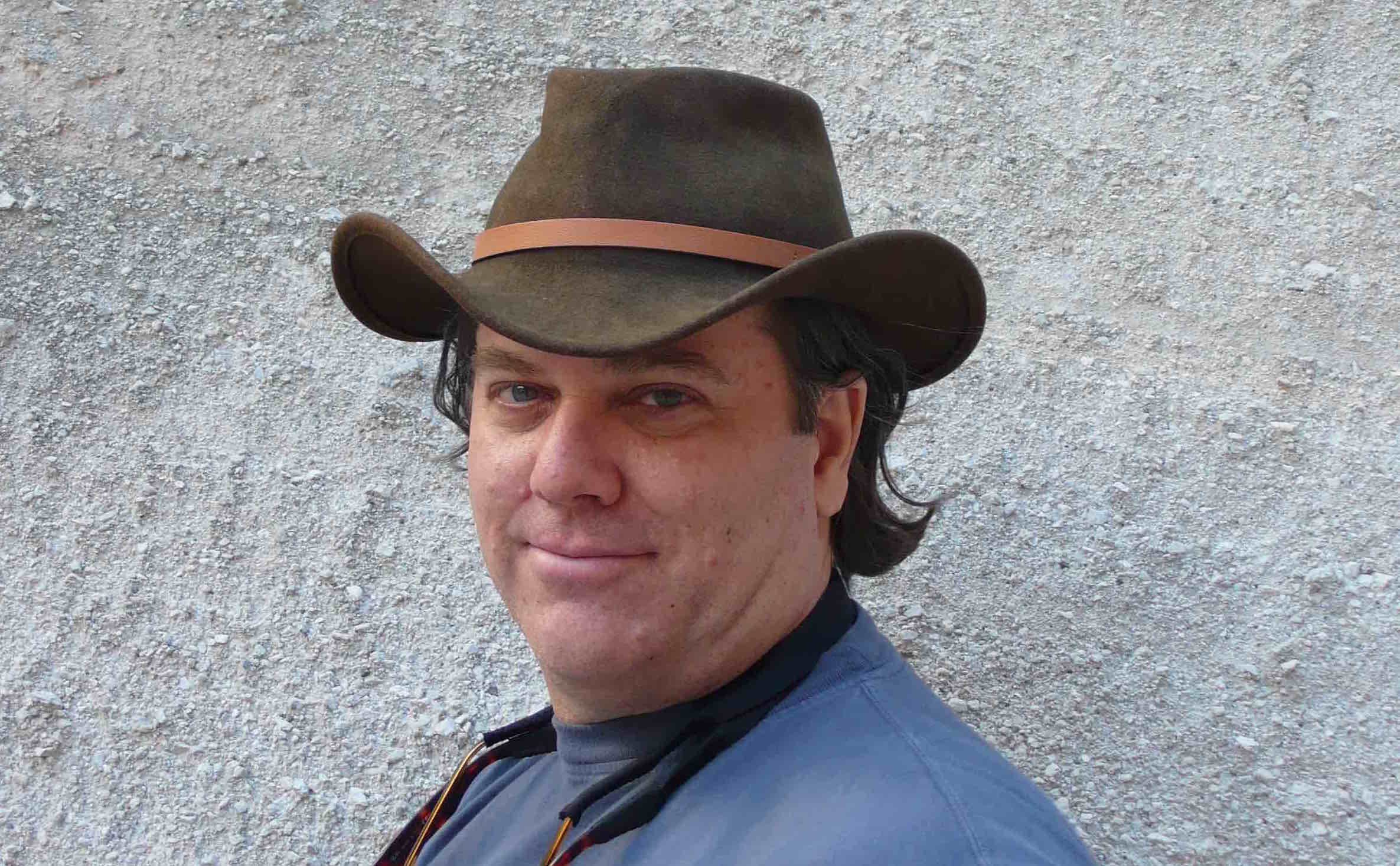
- Jim at Tent Rocks, New Mexico
- Born: June 30, 1955 (age 71); San Francisco, California, U.S.
- Education: University of California, Santa Cruz (BS); University of California, Santa Cruz (PhD)
- Scientific career
- Fields: Physics; Mathematics; Biology; Computation
- Workplaces: University of California, Davis; Santa Fe Institute; Art and Science Laboratory

James P. Crutchfield (born 1955) is an American mathematician and physicist. He received his B.A. summa cum laude in physics and mathematics from the University of California, Santa Cruz, in 1979 and his Ph.D. in physics there in 1983. Currently, he is a Distinguished Professor Emeritus of Physics and Astronomy at the University of California, Davis, where he directs the Complexity Sciences Center—a research and graduate program in complex systems.

Prior to this, he was Research Professor at the Santa Fe Institute for many years, where he ran the Dynamics of Learning Group and SFI's Network Dynamics Program funded by Intel Research. From 1985 to 1997, he was a Research Physicist in the Physics Department at the University of California, Berkeley. He has been a Visiting Research Professor in the Sloan Center for Theoretical Neurobiology, University of California, San Francisco; in the Physics Department, California Institute of Technology, Pasadena, California, and in the Institute for Advanced Study, University of Amsterdam, Netherlands; and a Postdoctoral Fellow of the Miller Institute for Basic Research in Science at UCB; a UCB Physics Department IBM Postdoctoral Fellow in condensed matter physics; a Distinguished Visiting Research Professor of the Beckman Institute at the University of Illinois, Urbana-Champaign; and a Bernard Osher Fellow at the San Francisco Exploratorium.

== Research ==
Over the last three decades, Crutchfield has worked in the areas of nonlinear dynamics, solid-state physics, astrophysics, fluid mechanics, critical phenomena and phase transitions, chaos, and pattern formation. His current research interests center on computational mechanics, the physics of complexity, statistical inference for nonlinear processes, genetic algorithms, evolutionary theory, machine learning, quantum dynamics, machine learning and distributed intelligence, and animal behavior and marine bioacoustics. He published over 250 papers in these areas.

In August 2021, using a specially-design underwater acoustic recording and playback system, Crutchfield instigated a 20-minute-long acoustic exchange with 35-year-old female humpback whale Twain in southeast Alaska. In August 2023, Crutchfield and his graduate student Alex Jurgens augmented the underwater acoustic system to record the full three-dimensional sound field of whale vocalizations, adapting the theory of ambisonics for underwater recording and playback. The resulting spatial audio recordings are available on compact disk.

In 2022, Crutchfield and his graduate student Kyle Ray described a way--momentum computing--to bring the heat production of conventional digital circuits below the theoretical limit of Landauer's principle by encoding information not as pulses of charge but in the momentum of moving particles..

For more than a decade Crutchfield and his close colleagues have run the summer workshop Information Engines at the Frontiers of Nonequilibrium Thermodynamics at the Telluride Science and Innovation Center in Telluride, Colorado.

== Life ==
While a graduate student, Crutchfield and students from the University of California, Santa Cruz (including Doyne Farmer) built a series of computers that were capable of calculating the motion of a moving roulette ball, predicting which numbers could be excluded from the outcome. Equipped with hidden electronic equipment of the early days of "mobile" computing, trials in Las Vegas showed success. However, because of technical limitation and the infamous gambler's ruin, the success was only partial and it was not feasible to use to make large profits. A book written about this project (The Eudaemonic Pie / Newton's Casino: The Bizarre True Story of How a Band of Physicists and Computer Wizards Took on Las Vegas) describes Crutchfield in his early years as "hacker-in-residence": "Crutchfield surfs, snorkels, and backpacks. But what he really cares about in life are computers...".

== Selected publications ==
- Packard, N. H.; Crutchfield, J. P.; Farmer, J. D.; Shaw, R. S. (1980-09-01). "Geometry from a Time Series". Physical Review Letters. 45 (9). American Physical Society (APS): 712–716. Bibcode:1980PhRvL..45..712P. doi:10.1103/physrevlett.45.712. ISSN 0031-9007.
- Melanie Mitchell, Peter Hraber (Santa Fe Institute), James P. Crutchfield (University of California, Berkeley), "Revisiting the Edge of Chaos: Evolving Cellular Automata to Perform Computations", SFI Working Paper, 93–03–014, arXiv:adap-org/9303003v1
- Crutchfield, J. P.; Mitchell, M. (1995-11-07). "The evolution of emergent computation". Proceedings of the National Academy of Sciences. 92 (23): 10742–10746. Bibcode:1995PNAS...9210742C. doi:10.1073/pnas.92.23.10742. ISSN 0027-8424. PMC 40688. PMID 11607588.
- van Nimwegen, E.; Crutchfield, J. P.; Huynen, M. (1999-08-17). "Neutral evolution of mutational robustness". Proceedings of the National Academy of Sciences. 96 (17): 9716–9720. arXiv:adap-org/9903006. Bibcode:1999PNAS...96.9716V. doi:10.1073/pnas.96.17.9716. ISSN 0027-8424. PMC 22276. PMID 10449760.

== See also ==
- Chaos: Making a New Science
