= Norman Packard =

American chaos theory physicist

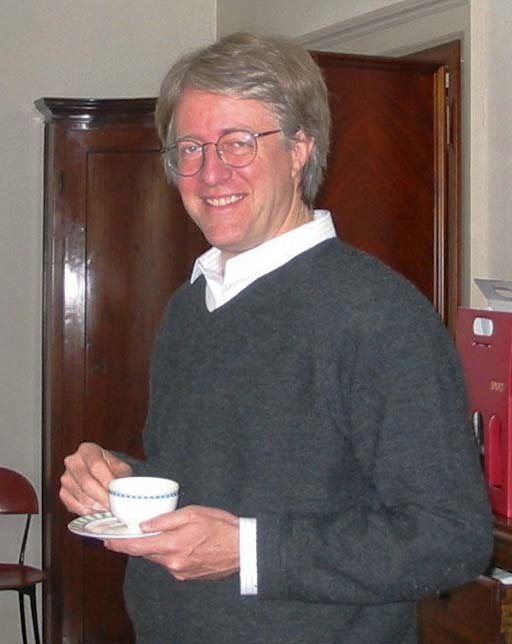
Norman Packard

Norman Harry Packard (born 1954 in Billings, Montana) is a chaos theory physicist and one of the founders of the Prediction Company and ProtoLife. He is an alumnus of Reed College, with a PhD from the University of California, Santa Cruz. Packard is known for his contributions to chaos theory, complex systems, and artificial life. He coined the phrase "the edge of chaos".

== Biography ==
Between 1976 and 1981, Packard formed the Dynamical Systems Collective at UC Santa Cruz with fellow physics graduate students, Rob Shaw, Doyne Farmer, and James Crutchfield. The collective was best known for its work in probing chaotic systems for signs of order.

Around the same time, he worked with Doyne Farmer and other friends in Santa Cruz, California to form the Eudaemons collective, to develop a strategy for beating the roulette wheel using a toe-operated computer. The computer could, in theory, predict in what area a roulette ball would land on a wheel, giving the player a significant statistical advantage over the house. Although the project itself was a success, they ran into practical difficulty employing the technique on-site in Las Vegas casinos. The experiences of Norman, Doyne Farmer, and crew were later chronicled in the book The Eudaemonic Pie (1985) by Thomas Bass. Their experience was also chronicled on the History Channel television series "Breaking Vegas."

In 1982, Packard won a NATO post-doctoral fellowship to study at the Institut des Hautes Études Scientifiques in Bures-sur-Yvette, France. One year later, he joined the Princeton Institute for Advanced Study. At the IAS, he worked with colleagues Stephen Wolfram and Rob Shaw to explain complex systems and the tendency for matter to organize itself. Subsequently, Packard has made contributions to the field of Artificial Life, including the definition of Evolutionary Activity.

== Professional work ==
=== Center for Complex Systems Research ===
In 1985 Packard moved with Wolfram to the physics department of the University of Illinois, where they founded the Center for Complex Systems Research.

=== Santa Fe Institute ===
Packard was involved with the Santa Fe Institute over many years, serving in several capacities including External Professor and member of the chair of the Science Steering Committee.

=== Prediction Company ===
In the spring of 1985, Packard and Doyne Farmer realized that their research in fields such as chaos, Genetic Algorithms and cellular automata could help build a system for predicting the stock market. Five years later they founded Prediction Company, a small company in Santa Fe, NM dedicated to making a model for predicting what a market would do during a certain time period. A brief outline of some of the genetic algorithm techniques he used in the early days is presented in chapter 2 of reference 5 below. In 2004, Prediction Company received the "Employer of Choice" award in the small size category for the State of New Mexico. Prediction Company was eventually acquired by UBS.

=== European Center for Living Technology ===
In 2004, Packard was one of the founders of the European Centre for Living Technology (ECLT), hosted by the University of Venice, Ca' Foscari. The ECLT received its first funding from PACE (Programmable Artificial Cell Evolution), a project coordinated by John S. McCaskill and funded by the European Union. From its inception in 2004 and for over a decade Packard has served on its science board, and as co-director.

=== ProtoLife ===
While in Venice, Packard founded ProtoLife, the first company to capitalize on living technology. The goal of the company is to optimize complex chemical reactions and other complex processes. The company was launched in Venice, Italy, and is currently based in San Francisco having changed name to Daptics (see below).

=== Lucky Sort ===
In 2011 Packard joined Lucky Sort as Chief Science Officer. At Lucky Sort he guides research to discover and display structure in high volume text data streams. Lucky Sort was eventually acquired by Twitter.

=== Daptics ===
In 2018, Packard launched a web-based optimization and discovery tool on the internet (a form of Software as a Service), changing the company name from ProtoLife to Daptics, to better reflect its new focus. The goal of the company is to optimize complex chemical reactions and other complex processes. The company is currently based in San Francisco.

== Books ==
- Artificial Life VII, with Mark A. Bedau, John S. McCaskill, Steen Rasmussen. 2000
- Protocells, with Steen Rasmussen, Mark Bedau, Liaohai Chen, David Deamer, David Krakauer, and Peter Stadler
- ‘’Adaptation Toward the Edge of Chaos’’, Norman H. Packard, University of Illinois at Urbana-Champaign, Center for Complex Systems Research, 1988

== See also ==
- Eudaemons
