= Melanie Mitchell =

American computer scientist

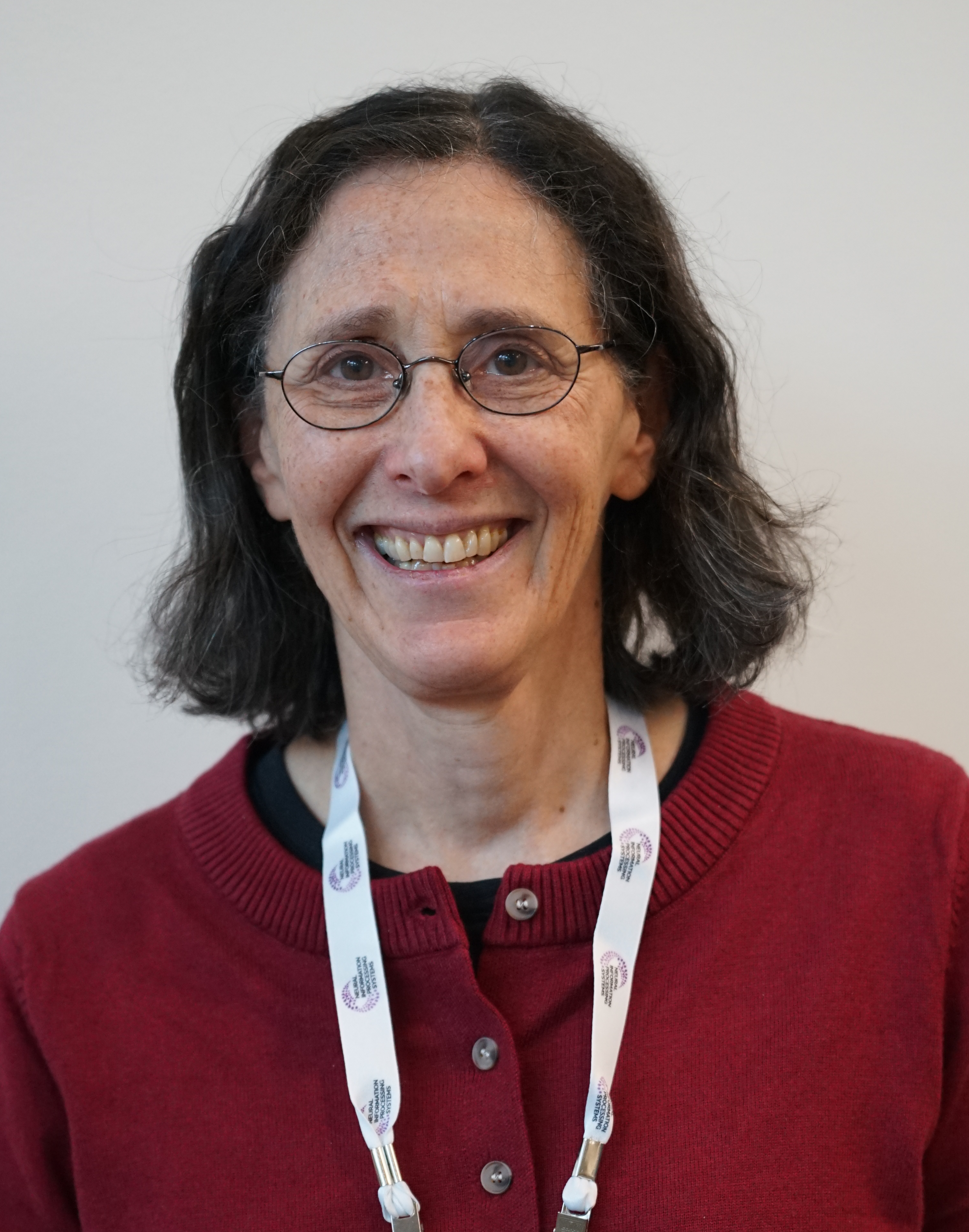
- Mitchell at NeurIPS in 2025
- Born: Los Angeles, California, US
- Education: Brown University; University of Michigan
- Awards: Phi Beta Kappa Award in Science (2010)
- Scientific career
- Fields: Complex systems Genetic algorithms
- Workplaces: University of Michigan; Santa Fe Institute; Los Alamos National Laboratory; OGI School of Science and Engineering; Portland State University
- Thesis: Copycat: A Computer Model of High-Level Perception and Conceptual Slippage in Analogy-Making (1990)
- Doctoral advisor: Douglas Hofstadter and John Holland
- Relatives: Jonathan Mitchell (brother)

Melanie Mitchell is an American computer scientist. She is a Professor at the Santa Fe Institute. Her major work has been in the areas of analogical reasoning, complex systems, genetic algorithms and cellular automata, and her publications in those fields are frequently cited.

She received her PhD in 1990 from the University of Michigan under Douglas Hofstadter and John Holland, for which she developed the Copycat cognitive architecture. She is the author of "Analogy-Making as Perception", essentially a book about Copycat. She has also critiqued Stephen Wolfram's A New Kind of Science and showed that genetic algorithms could find better solutions to the majority problem for one-dimensional cellular automata. She is the author of An Introduction to Genetic Algorithms, a widely known introductory book published by MIT Press in 1996. She is also author of Complexity: A Guided Tour (Oxford University Press, 2009), which won the 2010 Phi Beta Kappa Science Book Award, and Artificial Intelligence: A Guide for Thinking Humans (Farrar, Straus, and Giroux).

== Life ==
Melanie Mitchell was born and raised in Los Angeles, California. She attended Brown University in Providence, Rhode Island, where she studied physics, astronomy and mathematics. Her interest in artificial intelligence was spurred in college when she read Douglas Hofstadter's Gödel, Escher, Bach.

After graduating, she worked as a high school math teacher in New York City. Deciding she "needed to be" in artificial intelligence, Mitchell tracked down Douglas Hofstadter, repeatedly asking to become one of his graduate students. After finding Hofstadter's phone number at MIT, a determined Mitchell made several calls, all of which went unanswered. She was ultimately successful in reaching Hofstadter after calling at 11 p.m., and secured an internship working on the development of Copycat.

In the fall of 1984, Mitchell followed Hofstadter to the University of Michigan, submitting a "last minute" application to the university's doctoral program. She earned her Ph.D. in 1990 with the dissertation Copycat: A Computer Model of High-Level Perception and Conceptual Slippage in Analogy-Making.

== Career ==
Mitchell is a Professor at the Santa Fe Institute. Mitchell developed the Complexity Explorer platform for the Santa Fe Institute, which offers online courses. More than 25.000 students took Mitchell's course "Introduction to Complexity". In 2018, Barbara Grosz, Dawn Song and Melanie Mitchell organised the workshop "On Crashing the Barrier of Meaning in AI". She features regularly as a guest expert in the Learning Salon, an online interdisciplinary series of meetings about biological and artificial intelligence.

== Awards ==
In 2020, Mitchell received the Herbert A. Simon Award (NECSI).

== Views ==
While expressing strong support for AI research, Mitchell has expressed concern about AI's vulnerability to hacking as well as its ability to inherit social biases. On artificial general intelligence, Mitchell said in 2019 that "commonsense knowledge" and "humanlike abilities for abstraction and analogy making" might constitute the final step required to build superintelligent machines, but that current technology was not close to being able to solve this current problem. Mitchell believes that humanlike visual intelligence would require "general knowledge, abstraction, and language", and hypothesizes that visual understanding may have to be learned as an embodied agent rather than merely viewing pictures.

== Selected publications ==
=== Books ===
- Mitchell, Melanie (1993). Analogy-Making as Perception. MIT Press. ISBN 0-262-13289-3.
- Mitchell, Melanie (1998). An Introduction to Genetic Algorithms. Cambridge, Massachusetts, US: MIT Press. ISBN 0-262-63185-7.
- Mitchell, Melanie (2009). Complexity: A Guided Tour. Oxford, UK: Oxford University Press. ISBN 978-0-19-512441-5.
- Mitchell, Melanie (October 15, 2019). Artificial Intelligence: A Guide for Thinking Humans (First ed.). Farrar, Straus and Giroux. ISBN 978-0374257835.

=== Articles ===
- Mitchell, M., Holland, J. H., and Forrest, S. (1994). "When will a genetic algorithm outperform hill climbing?". Advances in Neural Information Processing Systems. 6: 51–58.
- Melanie Mitchell, Peter T. Hraber, and James P. Crutchfield (1993). "Revisiting the edge of chaos: Evolving cellular automata to perform computations" (PDF). Complex Systems. 7: 89–130. arXiv:adap-org/9303003. Bibcode:1993adap.org..3003M.
- Cowan, George; David Pines; David Elliott Meltzer (1999). Complexity : metaphors, models, and reality. Cambridge, Massachusetts, US: Perseus Books. ISBN 978-0738202327.
