= Thomas Bass =

American academic (born 1951)

- Born: March 9, 1951 (age 75); United States
- Occupation: Professor

Thomas Alden Bass (born March 9, 1951) is an American writer and professor of literature, journalism, and history.

== Biography ==
Bass graduated with an honors A.B. from the University of Chicago in 1973 and earned his Ph.D. in the History of Consciousness from the University of California Santa Cruz in 1980. He has received fellowships from the New York Foundation for the Arts, Blue Mountain Center, the Regents of the University of California, and the Ford Foundation. He has taught literature and history at Hamilton College and the University of California and is former director of the Hamilton in New York City Program on "Media in the Digital Age." In 2011 he taught a lecture class at Sciences Po Paris on "The Political Economy of the Media".

Currently Bass is a Professor of English and Journalism at University at Albany, State University of New York.

Bass has appeared on Good Morning America, CNN, NPR, BBC, and other venues to promote his books. He is the author of numerous articles for Wired, The New York Times, The New Yorker, Smithsonian, Discover, and other magazines.

Bass currently lives in New York City and Paris with his wife and three children.

=== Publications ===
The 1985 publication of his book The Eudaemonic Pie is believed to have motivated the passage of a Nevada law banning the use of devices to gain an advantage at casino games.

In his preface to Camping with the Prince, Bass states that he accompanied seven scientific expeditions into Africa from 1985 to 1987. This book focuses on African viewpoints to the African situation. It underlines the intricacy of Africa, more complex and more resilient than generally assumed by those looking at the continent from the outside. Among the African scientists presented to readers of this book are Oyewale Tomori and Thomas Odhiambo. Bass also mentions in that preface that when he was a teenager he traveled along Africa's east coast, down the Congo and up West Africa.

=== Bibliography ===
- The Eudaemonic Pie (Houghton Mifflin, 1985; Vintage, 1986; Penguin 1991).
- Camping with the Prince and Other Tales of Science in Africa (Houghton Mifflin, 1990; Penguin 1991; Moyer Bell, 1997)
- Reinventing the Future (Addison-Wesley, 1994, 1995)
- Vietnamerica: The War Comes Home (Soho, 1996, 1997)
- The Predictors (Holt / Viking-Penguin, 1999)
- The Spy Who Loved Us (Public Affairs, 2009)
