= Roulette =

Casino game of chance

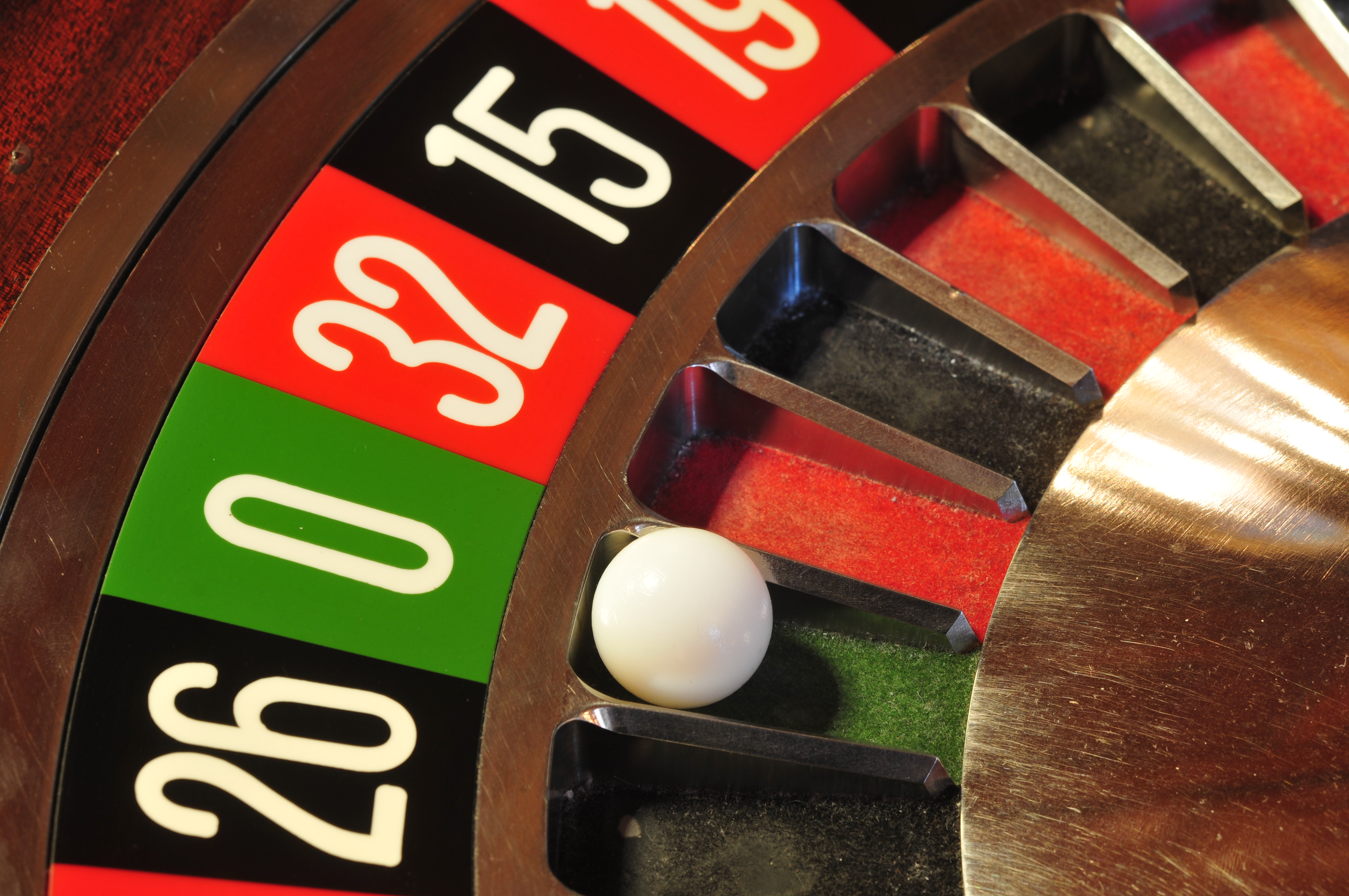
Roulette ball

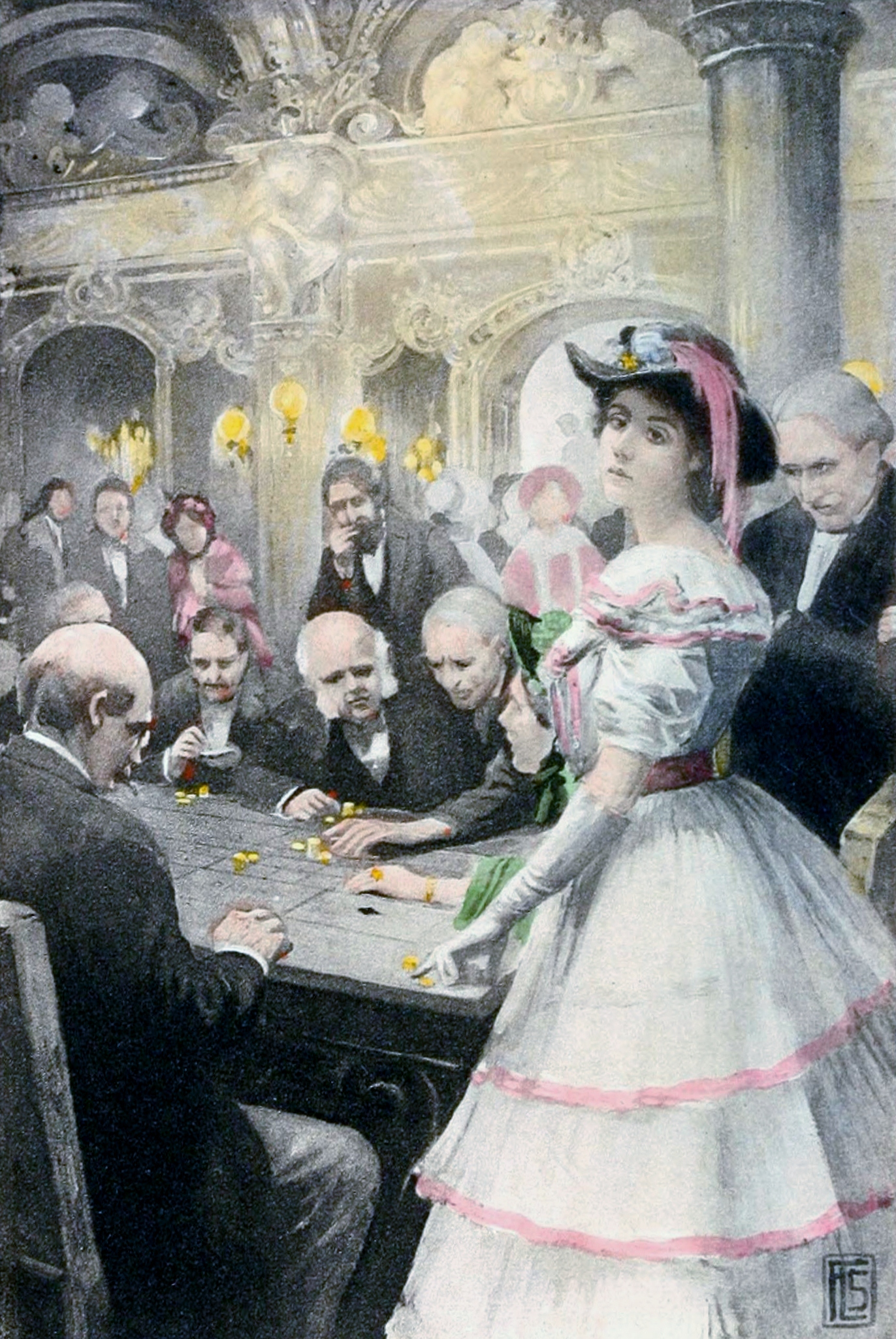
"Gwendolen at the roulette table" – 1910 illustration to George Eliot's Daniel Deronda

Roulette French pronunciation: [rü-ˈlet] (named after the French word meaning "little wheel") is a casino game which was likely developed from the Italian game Biribi. In the game, a player may choose to place a bet on a single number, various groupings of numbers, the color red or black, whether the number is odd or even, or if the number is high or low.

To determine the winning number, a croupier spins a wheel in one direction, then spins a ball in the opposite direction around a tilted circular track running around the outer edge of the wheel. The ball eventually loses momentum, passes through an area of deflectors, and falls onto the wheel and into one of the colored and numbered pockets on the wheel. The winnings are then paid to anyone who has placed a successful bet.

== History ==
18th-century E.O. wheel with gamblers

The first form of roulette was devised in 18th-century France. Many historians believe Blaise Pascal introduced a primitive form of roulette in the 17th century in his search for a perpetual motion machine. The roulette mechanism is a hybrid of a gaming wheel invented in 1720 and the Italian game Biribi. A primitive form of roulette, known as "EO" (Even/Odd), was played in England in the late 18th century using a gaming wheel similar to that used in roulette.

The game has been played in its present form since as early as 1796 in Paris. An early description of the roulette game in its current form is found in a French novel La Roulette, ou le Jour by Jaques Lablee, which describes a roulette wheel in the Palais Royal in Paris in 1796. The description included the house pockets: "There are exactly two slots reserved for the bank, whence it derives its sole mathematical advantage." It then goes on to describe the layout with "two betting spaces containing the bank's two numbers, zero and double zero". The book was published in 1801. An even earlier reference to a game of this name was published in regulations for New France (Québec) in 1758, which banned the games of "dice, hoca, faro, and roulette".

The roulette wheels used in the casinos of Paris in the late 1790s had red for the single zero and black for the double zero. To avoid confusion, the color green was selected for the zeros in roulette wheels starting in the 1800s.

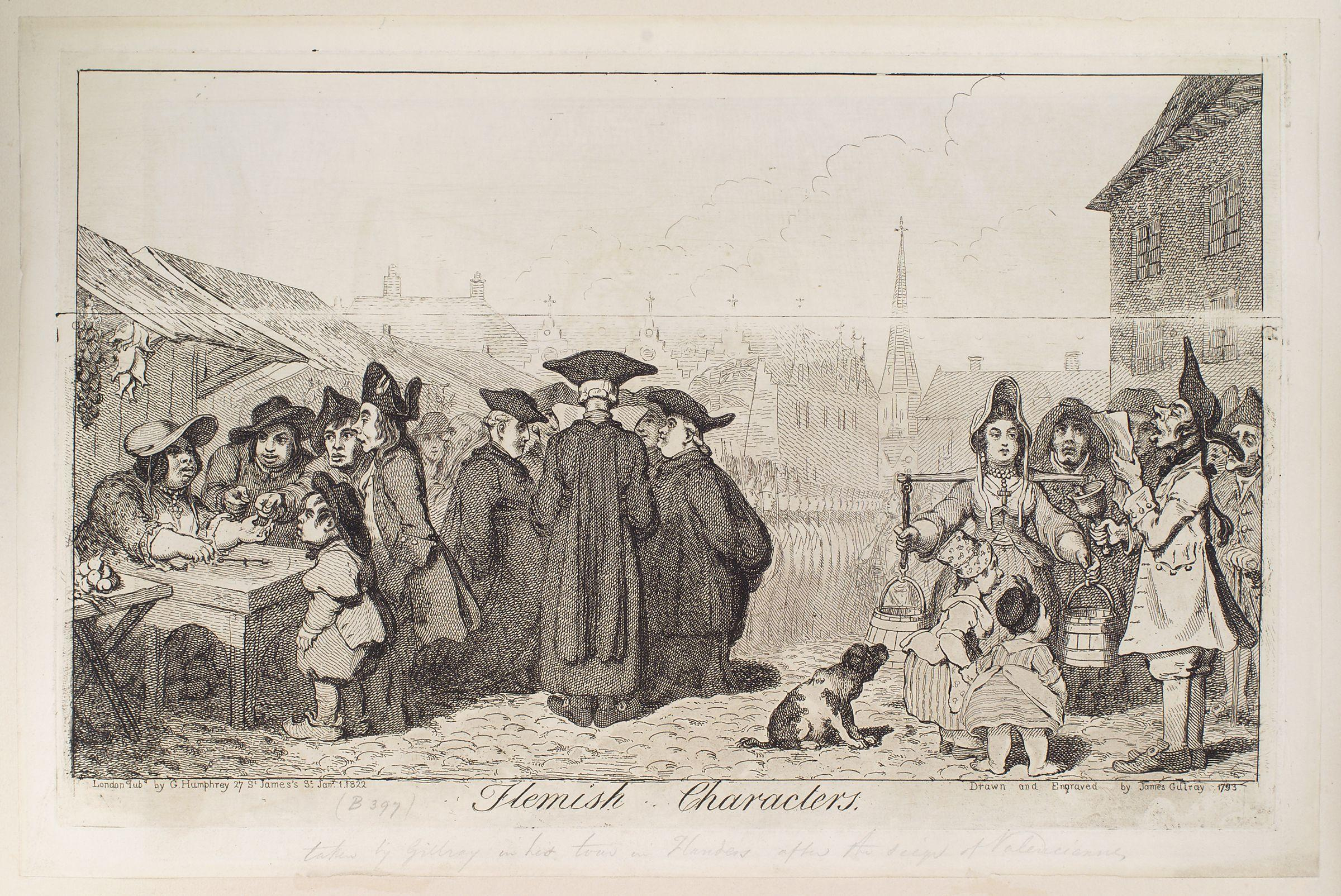
A caricature by James Gillray, 1822

In 1843, in the German spa casino town of Bad Homburg, fellow Frenchmen François and Louis Blanc introduced the single 0 style roulette wheel in order to compete against other casinos offering the traditional wheel with single and double zero house pockets.

In some forms of early American roulette wheels, there were numbers 1 to 28, plus a single zero, a double zero, and an American Eagle. The Eagle slot, which was a symbol of American liberty, was a house slot that brought the casino an extra edge. Soon, the tradition vanished and since then the wheel features only numbered slots. According to Hoyle "the single 0, the double 0, and the eagle are never bars; but when the ball falls into either of them, the banker sweeps every thing upon the table, except what may happen to be bet on either one of them, when he pays twenty-seven for one, which is the amount paid for all sums bet upon any single figure".

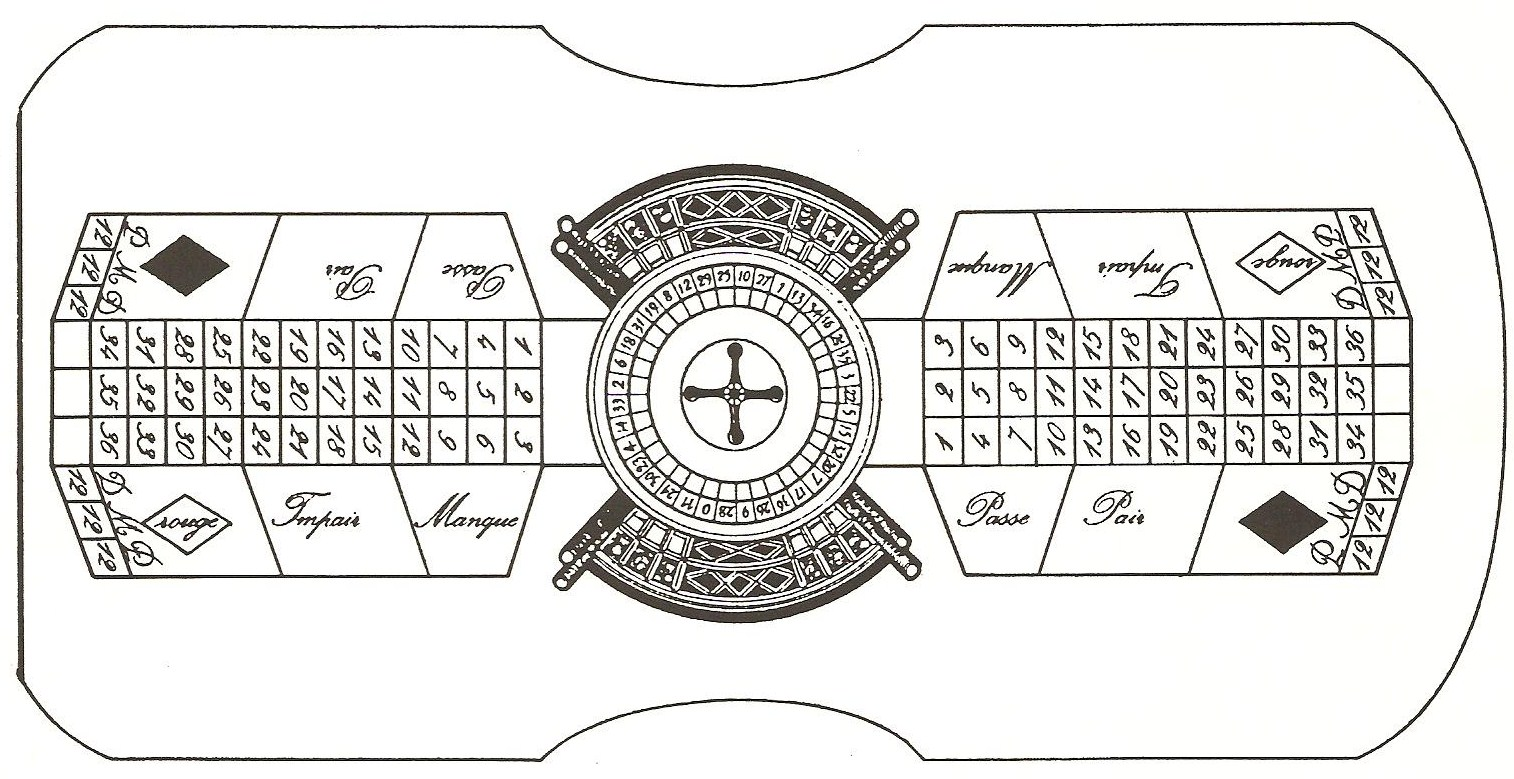
1800s engraving of the French roulette

In the 19th century, roulette spread all over Europe and the US, becoming one of the most popular casino games. When legal gambling was discontinued at Bad Homburg in the 1860s, the Blanc family moved to the last legal remaining casino operation in Europe at Monte Carlo, where they established a gambling mecca for the elite of Europe. It was here that the single zero roulette wheel became the premier game, and over the years was exported around the world, except in the United States where the double zero wheel remained dominant.

Early American West makeshift game

In the United States, the French double zero wheel made its way up the Mississippi from New Orleans, and then westward. It was here, because of rampant cheating by both operators and gamblers, that the wheel was eventually placed on top of the table to prevent devices from being hidden in the table or wheel, and the betting layout was simplified. This eventually evolved into the American-style roulette game. The American game was developed in the gambling dens across the new territories where makeshift games had been set up, whereas the French game evolved with style and leisure in Monte Carlo.

During the first part of the 20th century, the only casino towns of note were Monte Carlo with the traditional single zero French wheel, and Las Vegas with the American double zero wheel. In the 1970s, casinos began to flourish around the world. In 1996 the first online casino, generally believed to be InterCasino, made it possible to play roulette online. By 2008, there were several hundred casinos worldwide offering roulette games. The double zero wheel is found in the United States, Canada, South America, and the Caribbean, while the single zero wheel is predominant elsewhere.

== Rules of play against a casino ==
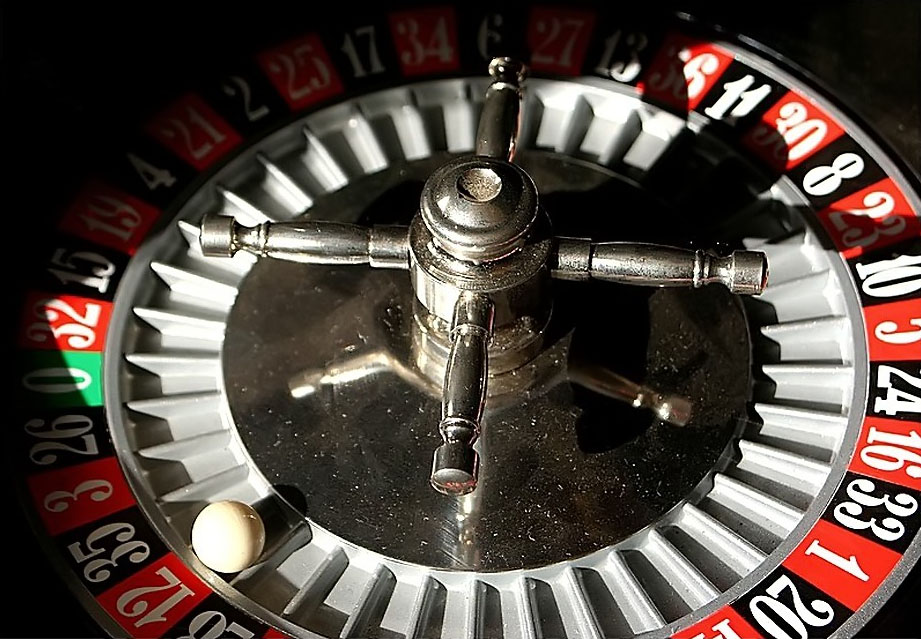
Roulette with red 12 as the winner

Roulette players have a variety of betting options. "Inside" bets involve selecting either the exact number on which the ball will land, or a small group of numbers adjacent to each other on the layout. "Outside" bets, by contrast, allow players to select a larger group of numbers based on properties such as their color or parity (odd/even). The payout odds for each type of bet are based on its probability.

The roulette table usually imposes minimum and maximum bets, and these rules usually apply separately for all of a player's inside and outside bets for each spin. For inside bets at roulette tables, some casinos may use separate roulette table chips of various colors to distinguish players at the table. Players can continue to place bets as the ball spins around the wheel until the dealer announces "no more bets" or "rien ne va plus".

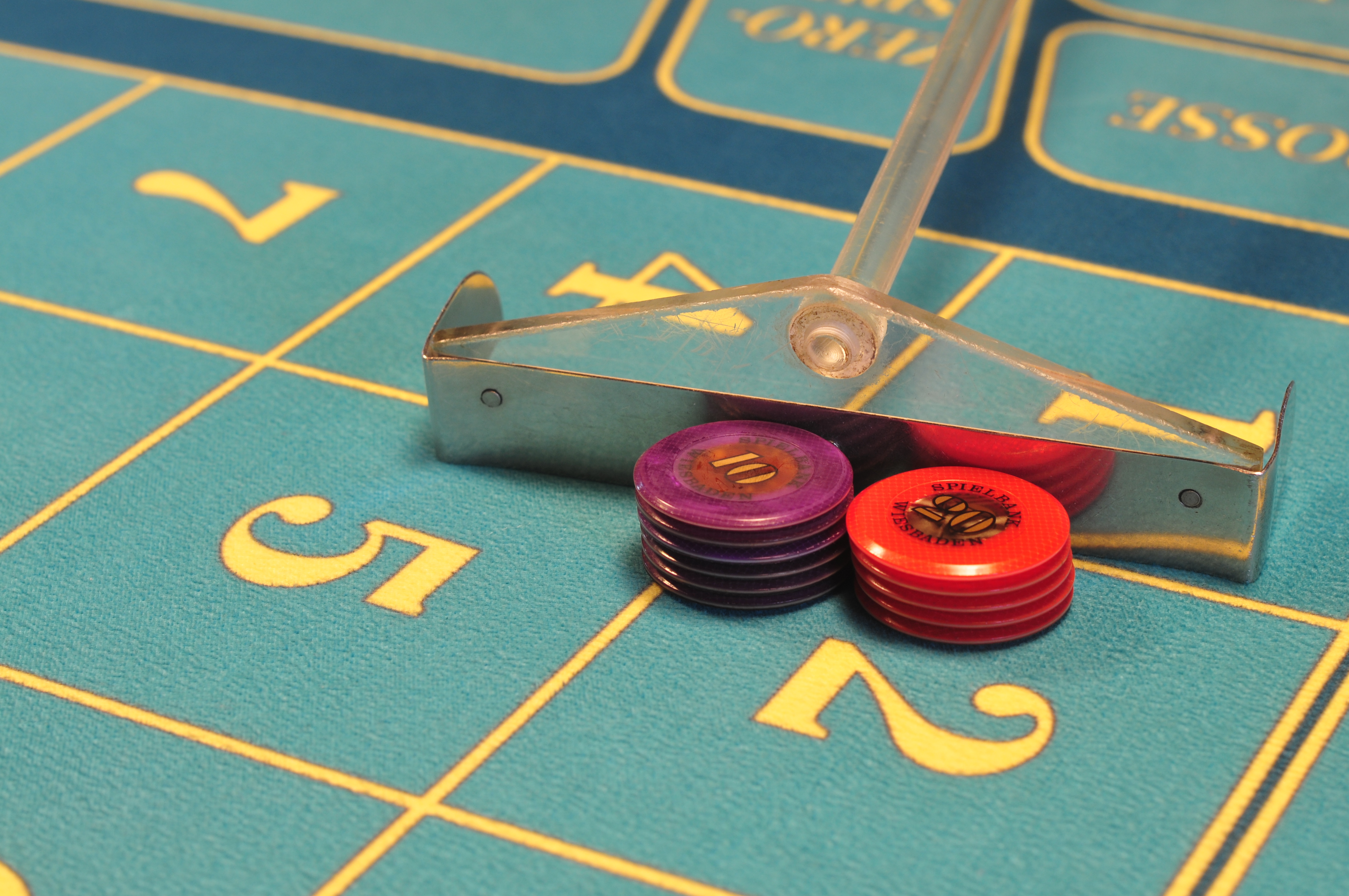
Croupier's rake pushing chips across a roulette layout

When a winning number and color is determined by the roulette wheel, the dealer will place a marker, also known as a dolly, on that number on the roulette table layout. When the dolly is on the table, no players may place bets, collect bets or remove any bets from the table. The dealer will then sweep away all losing bets either by hand or by rake, and determine the payouts for the remaining inside and outside winning bets. When the dealer is finished making payouts, the dolly is removed from the board and players may collect their winnings and make new bets. Winning chips remain on the board until picked up by a player.

=== California roulette ===
In California, traditional roulette is explicitly illegal, but a house-banked card game called California roulette is legal in casinos. California roulette approximates the bets and odds of traditional roulette, using a randomized 38-card deck placed inside of a wheel.

== Roulette wheel number sequence ==
The pockets of the roulette wheel are numbered from 0 to 36.

In number ranges from 1 to 10 and 19 to 28, odd numbers are red and even are black. In ranges from 11 to 18 and 29 to 36, odd numbers are black and even are red.

There is a green pocket numbered 0 (zero). In American roulette, there is a second green pocket marked 00. Pocket number order on the roulette wheel adheres to the following clockwise sequence in most casinos:

Single-zero wheel
0-32-15-19-4-21-2-25-17-34-6-27-13-36-11-30-8-23-10-5-24-16-33-1-20-14-31-9-22-18-29-7-28-12-35-3-26
Double-zero wheel
0-28-9-26-30-11-7-20-32-17-5-22-34-15-3-24-36-13-1-00-27-10-25-29-12-8-19-31-18-6-21-33-16-4-23-35-14-2
Triple-zero wheel
0-000-00-32-15-19-4-21-2-25-17-34-6-27-13-36-11-30-8-23-10-5-24-16-33-1-20-14-31-9-22-18-29-7-28-12-35-3-26

== Roulette table layout ==
French style layout, French single zero wheel

The cloth-covered betting area on a roulette table is known as the layout. The layout is either single-zero or double-zero.

The European-style layout has a single zero, and the American style layout is usually a double-zero. The American-style roulette table with a wheel at one end is now used in most casinos because it has a higher house edge compared to a European layout.

The French style table with a wheel in the centre and a layout on either side is rarely found outside of Monte Carlo.

== Types of bets ==
In roulette, bets can be either inside or outside. Bets are sometimes known by their French names.

=== Inside bets ===
Name	Description	Chip placement
Straight/single	Bet on a single number	Entirely within the square for the chosen number
Split	Bet on two vertically/horizontally adjacent numbers (e.g. 14–17 or 8–9)	On the edge shared by the numbers
Street	Bet on three consecutive numbers in a horizontal line (e.g. 7–8–9)	On the outer edge of the number at either end of the line
Corner/square	Bet on four numbers that meet at one corner (e.g. 10–11–13–14)	On the common corner
Six line/double street	Bet on six consecutive numbers that form two horizontal lines (e.g. 31–32–33–34–35–36)	On the outer corner shared by the two leftmost or the two rightmost numbers
Trio/basket	A three–number bet that involves at least one zero: 0–1–2 (either layout); 0–2–3 (single–zero only); 0–00–2 and 00–2–3 (double–zero only)	On the corner shared by the three chosen numbers
First four	Bet on 0–1–2–3 (single–zero layout only)	On the outer corner shared by 0–1 or 0–3
Top line	Bet on 0–00–1–2–3 (double–zero layout only)	On the outer corner shared by 0–1 or 00–3

=== Outside bets ===
Outside bets typically have smaller payouts with better odds at winning. Except as noted, all of these bets lose if a 0 comes up.

- 1 to 18 (low or manqué, lit. 'missed'), or 19 to 36 (high or passé, lit. 'passed'): A bet that the number will be in the chosen range.
- Red or black (rouge or noir): A bet that the number will be the chosen color.
- Even or odd (pair or impair): A bet that the number will be of the chosen parity. Unlike in mathematics, in roulette 0 is considered neither even nor odd.
- Dozen bet: A bet that the number will be in the chosen dozen: first (1–12, première douzaine or P12), second (13–24, moyenne douzaine or M12), or third (25–36, dernière douzaine or D12).
- Column bet: A bet that the number will be in the chosen vertical column of 12 numbers, such as 1–4–7–10 on down to 34. The chip is placed on the space below the final number in this sequence.
- Snake bet: A special bet that covers the red numbers 1, 5, 9, 12, 14, 16, 19, 23, 27, 30, 32, and 34. It has the same payout as the dozen bet and takes its name from the zig-zagging, snakelike pattern traced out by these numbers. The snake bet is not available in all casinos; when it is allowed, the chip is placed on the lower corner of the 34 square that borders the 19–36 betting box. Some layouts mark the bet with a two-headed snake that winds from 1 to 34, and the bet can be placed on the head at either end of the body.

In some casinos, the farthest outside bets (low/high, red/black, even/odd) result in the player losing only half of their bet if a zero comes up. This is known as the "halfback" or la partage rule. Others may use an "imprisonment" or en prison rule, wherein a loss on such an outside bet causes the player's money to be "imprisoned", and if the next spin would be a win for that bet, the player's wager is returned.

== Bet odds table ==
The expected value of a $1 bet (except for the special case of top line bets), for American and European roulette, can be calculated as

$$\text{expected value} = \frac{1}{n} (36 - n) = \frac{36}{n} - 1,$$

where n is the number of pockets in the wheel.

The initial bet is returned in addition to the mentioned payout: it can be easily demonstrated that this payout formula would lead to a zero expected value of profit if there were only 36 numbers (that is, the casino would break even). Having 37 or more numbers gives the casino its edge.

Bet name	Winning spaces	Payout	French		American	
Bet name	Winning spaces	Payout	Odds against winning	Expected value (on $1 bet)	Odds against winning	Expected value (on $1 bet)
0	0	35 to 1	36 to 1	−$0.027	37 to 1	−$0.053
00	00	35 to 1			37 to 1	−$0.053
Straight up	Any single number	35 to 1	36 to 1	−$0.027	37 to 1	−$0.053
Row	0, 00	17 to 1			18 to 1	−$0.053
Split	Any two adjoining numbers vertical or horizontal	17 to 1	17 1/2 to 1	−$0.027	18 to 1	−$0.053
Street	Any three numbers horizontal (1, 2, 3 or 4, 5, 6, etc.)	11 to 1	11 1/3 to 1	−$0.027	11 2/3 to 1	−$0.053
Corner	Any four adjoining numbers in a block (1, 2, 4, 5 or 17, 18, 20, 21, etc.)	8 to 1	8 1/4 to 1	−$0.027	8 1/2 to 1	−$0.053
Top line (US)	0, 00, 1, 2, 3	6 to 1			6 3/5 to 1	−$0.079
Top line (European)	0, 1, 2, 3	8 to 1	8 1/4 to 1	−$0.027		
Double street	Any six numbers from two horizontal rows (1, 2, 3, 4, 5, 6 or 28, 29, 30, 31, 32, 33 etc.)	5 to 1	5 1/6 to 1	−$0.027	5 1/3 to 1	−$0.053
1st column	1, 4, 7, 10, 13, 16, 19, 22, 25, 28, 31, 34	2 to 1	2 1/12 to 1	−$0.027	2 1/6 to 1	−$0.053
2nd column	2, 5, 8, 11, 14, 17, 20, 23, 26, 29, 32, 35	2 to 1	2 1/12 to 1	−$0.027	2 1/6 to 1	−$0.053
3rd column	3, 6, 9, 12, 15, 18, 21, 24, 27, 30, 33, 36	2 to 1	2 1/12 to 1	−$0.027	2 1/6 to 1	−$0.053
1st dozen	1 through 12	2 to 1	2 1/12 to 1	−$0.027	2 1/6 to 1	−$0.053
2nd dozen	13 through 24	2 to 1	2 1/12 to 1	−$0.027	2 1/6 to 1	−$0.053
3rd dozen	25 through 36	2 to 1	2 1/12 to 1	−$0.027	2 1/6 to 1	−$0.053
Odd	1, 3, 5, ..., 35	1 to 1	1 1/18 to 1	−$0.027	1 1/9 to 1	−$0.053
Even	2, 4, 6, ..., 36	1 to 1	1 1/18 to 1	−$0.027	1 1/9 to 1	−$0.053
Red	32, 19, 21, 25, 34, 27, 36, 30, 23, 5, 16, 1, 14, 9, 18, 7, 12, 3	1 to 1	1 1/18 to 1	−$0.027	1 1/9 to 1	−$0.053
Black	15, 4, 2, 17, 6, 13, 11, 8, 10, 24, 33, 20, 31, 22, 29, 28, 35, 26	1 to 1	1 1/18 to 1	−$0.027	1 1/9 to 1	−$0.053
1 to 18	1, 2, 3, ..., 18	1 to 1	1 1/18 to 1	−$0.027	1 1/9 to 1	−$0.053
19 to 36	19, 20, 21, ..., 36	1 to 1	1 1/18 to 1	−$0.027	1 1/9 to 1	−$0.053

Top line (0, 00, 1, 2, 3) has a different expected value because of approximation of the correct 6 1/5-to-1 payout obtained by the formula to 6-to-1.

If en prison rules are used, the house edge on the 1:1 bets is reduced to 1.35%-1.38% on a single-zero wheel, and to 2.63% on a double-zero wheel.

== House edge ==
The house average or house edge or house advantage (also called the expected value) is the amount the player loses relative to any bet made, on average. If a player bets on a single number in the American game there is a probability of 1/38 that the player wins 35 times the bet, and a 37/38 chance that the player loses their bet. The expected value is:

−1 × 37/38 + 35 × 1/38 = −0.0526 (5.26% house edge)

For European roulette, a single number wins 1/37 and loses 36/37:

−1 × 36/37 + 35 × 1/37 = −0.0270 (2.70% house edge)

For triple-zero wheels, a single number wins 1/39 and loses 38/39:

−1 × 38/39 + 35 × 1/39 = −0.0769 (7.69% house edge)

== Mathematical model ==
As an example, the European roulette model, that is, roulette with only one zero, can be examined. Since this roulette has 37 cells with equal odds of hitting, this is a final model of field probability $\left(\Omega, 2^\Omega, \mathbb{P}\right)$, where $\Omega = \{0, \ldots, 36\}$, $\mathbb{P}(A) = \frac{|A|}{37}$ for all $A \in 2^\Omega$.

Call the bet $S$ a triple $(A, r, \xi)$, where $A$ is the set of chosen numbers, $r \in \mathbb{R}_+$ is the size of the bet, and $\xi: \Omega \to \mathbb{R}$ determines the return of the bet.

The rules of European roulette have 10 types of bets. First the 'Straight Up' bet can be imagined. In this case, $S = (\{\omega_{0}\}, r, \xi)$, for some $\omega_{0} \in \Omega$, and $\xi$ is determined by

$$\xi(\omega) = \begin{cases}
-r, &\omega \ne \omega_0\\
35 \cdot r, &\omega = \omega_0
\end{cases}$$

The bet's expected net return, or profitability, is equal to

$$M[\xi] =
\frac{1}{37} \sum_{\omega \in \Omega} \xi(\omega) =
\frac{1}{37} \left(\xi(\omega_0) +
\sum_{\omega \ne \omega_0} \xi(\omega)\right) =
\frac{1}{37} \left(35 \cdot r - 36 \cdot r \right) =
-\frac{r}{37} \approx -0.027r.$$

Without details, for a bet, black (or red), the rule is determined as

$$\xi(\omega) = \begin{cases}
-r, &\omega \text{ is red} \\
-r, &\omega = 0 \\
r, &\omega \text{ is black}
\end{cases},$$

and the profitability

$$M[\xi] = \frac{1}{37}(18 \cdot r - 18 \cdot r - r) = -\frac{r}{37}$$.

For similar reasons it is simple to see that the profitability is also equal for all remaining types of bets. $-\frac{r}{37}$.

In reality this means that, the more bets a player makes, the more they are going to lose independent of the strategies (combinations of bet types or size of bets) that they employ:

$$\sum_{n = 1}^{\infty}M[\xi_n] = -\frac{1}{37}\sum_{n = 1}^{\infty}r_n \to -\infty.$$

Here, the profit margin for the roulette owner is equal to approximately 2.7%. Nevertheless, several roulette strategy systems have been developed despite the losing odds. These systems can not change the odds of the game in favor of the player.

The odds for the player in American roulette are even worse, as the bet profitability is at worst $-\frac{3}{38}r \approx -0.0789r$, and never better than $-\frac{r}{19} \approx -0.0526r$.

=== Simplified mathematical model ===
For a roulette wheel with $n$ green numbers and 36 other unique numbers, the chance of the ball landing on a given number is $\frac{1}{(36+n)}$. For a betting option with $p$ numbers defining a win, the chance of winning a bet is $\frac{p}{(36+n)}$

For example, if a player bets on red, there are 18 red numbers, $p = 18$, so the chance of winning is $\frac{18}{(36+n)}$.

The payout given by the casino for a win is based on the roulette wheel having 36 outcomes, and the payout for a bet is given by $\frac{36}{p}$.

For example, betting on 1-12 there are 12 numbers that define a win, $p = 12$, the payout is $\frac{36}{12} = 3$, so the bettor wins 3 times their bet.

The average return on a player's bet is given by $\frac{p}{(36+n)} \cdot \frac{36}{p} = \frac{36}{(36+n)}$

For $n > 0$, the average return is always lower than 1, so on average a player will lose money.

With 1 green number, $n = 1$, the average return is $\frac{36}{37}$, that is, after a bet the player will on average have $\frac{36}{37}$ of their original bet returned to them. With 2 green numbers, $n = 2$, the average return is $\frac{36}{38}$. With 3 green numbers, $n = 3$, the average return is $\frac{36}{39}$.

This shows that the expected return is independent of the choice of bet.

== Called (or call) bets or announced bets ==
Traditional roulette wheel sectors

Although most often named "call bets" technically these bets are more accurately referred to as "announced bets". The legal distinction between a "call bet" and an "announced bet" is that a "call bet" is a bet called by the player without placing any money on the table to cover the cost of the bet. In many jurisdictions (most notably the United Kingdom) this is considered gambling on credit and is illegal. An "announced bet" is a bet called by the player for which they immediately place enough money to cover the amount of the bet on the table, prior to the outcome of the spin or hand in progress being known.

There are different number series in roulette that have special names attached to them. Most commonly these bets are known as "the French bets" and each covers a section of the wheel. For the sake of accuracy, zero spiel, although explained below, is not a French bet, it is more accurately "the German bet". Players at a table may bet a set amount per series (or multiples of that amount). The series are based on the way certain numbers lie next to each other on the roulette wheel. Not all casinos offer these bets, and some may offer additional bets or variations on these.

=== Voisins du zéro (neighbors of zero) ===
This is a name, more accurately "grands voisins du zéro", for the 17 numbers that lie between 22 and 25 on the wheel, including 22 and 25 themselves. The series is 22-18-29-7-28-12-35-3-26-0-32-15-19-4-21-2-25 (on a single-zero wheel).

Nine chips or multiples thereof are bet. Two chips are placed on the 0-2-3 trio; one on the 4–7 split; one on 12–15; one on 18–21; one on 19–22; two on the 25-26-28-29 corner; and one on 32–35.

=== Jeu zéro (zero game) ===
Zero game, also known as zero spiel (Spiel is German for game or play), is the name for the numbers closest to zero. All numbers in the zero game are included in the voisins, but are placed differently. The numbers bet on are 12-35-3-26-0-32-15.

The bet consists of four chips or multiples thereof. Three chips are bet on splits and one chip straight-up: one chip on 0–3 split, one on 12–15 split, one on 32–35 split and one straight-up on number 26.

This type of bet is popular in Germany and many European casinos. It is also offered as a 5-chip bet in many Eastern European casinos. As a 5-chip bet, it is known as "zero spiel naca" and includes, in addition to the chips placed as noted above, a straight-up on number 19.

=== Le tiers du cylindre (third of the wheel) ===
This is the name for the 12 numbers that lie on the opposite side of the wheel between 27 and 33, including 27 and 33 themselves. On a single-zero wheel, the series is 27-13-36-11-30-8-23-10-5-24-16-33. The full name (although very rarely used, most players refer to it as "tiers") for this bet is "le tiers du cylindre" (translated from French into English meaning one third of the wheel) because it covers 12 numbers (placed as 6 splits), which is as close to 1/3 of the wheel as one can get.

Very popular in British casinos, tiers bets outnumber voisins and orphelins bets by a massive margin.

Six chips or multiples thereof are bet. One chip is placed on each of the following splits: 5–8, 10–11, 13–16, 23–24, 27–30, and 33–36.

The tiers bet is also called the "small series" and in some casinos (most notably in South Africa) "series 5-8".

A variant known as "tiers 5-8-10-11" has an additional chip placed straight up on 5, 8, 10, and 11 and so is a 10-piece bet. In some places the variant is called "gioco Ferrari" with a straight up on 8, 11, 23 and 30, the bet is marked with a red G on the racetrack.

=== Orphelins (orphans) ===
These numbers make up the two slices of the wheel outside the tiers and voisins. They contain a total of 8 numbers, comprising 17-34-6 and 1-20-14-31-9.

Five chips or multiples thereof are bet on four splits and a straight-up: one chip is placed straight-up on 1 and one chip on each of the splits: 6–9, 14–17, 17–20, and 31–34.

=== ... and the neighbors ===
A number may be backed along with the two numbers on either side of it in a 5-chip bet. For example, "0 and the neighbors" is a 5-chip bet with one piece straight-up on 3, 26, 0, 32, and 15. Neighbors bets are often put on in combinations, for example "1, 9, 14, and the neighbors" is a 15-chip bet covering 18, 22, 33, 16 with one chip, 9, 31, 20, 1 with two chips and 14 with three chips.

Any of the above bets may be combined; e.g. "orphelins by 1 and zero and the neighbors by 1". The "...and the neighbors" is often assumed by the croupier.

=== Final bets ===
Another bet offered on the single-zero game is "final", "finale", or "finals".

Final 4, for example, is a 4-chip bet and consists of one chip placed on each of the numbers ending in 4, that is 4, 14, 24, and 34. Final 7 is a 3-chip bet, one chip each on 7, 17, and 27. Final bets from final 0 (zero) to final 6 cost four chips. Final bets 7, 8 and 9 cost three chips.

Some casinos also offer split-final bets, for example final 5-8 would be a 4-chip bet, one chip each on the splits 5–8, 15–18, 25–28, and one on 35.

=== Full completes/maximums ===
A complete bet places all of the inside bets on a certain number. Full complete bets are most often bet by high rollers as maximum bets.

The maximum amount allowed to be wagered on a single bet in European roulette is based on a progressive betting model. If the casino allows a maximum bet of $1,000 on a 35-to-1 straight-up, then on each 17-to-1 split connected to that straight-up, $2,000 may be wagered. Each 8-to-1 corner that covers four numbers) may have $4,000 wagered on it. Each 11-to-1 street that covers three numbers may have $3,000 wagered on it. Each 5-to-1 six-line may have $6,000 wagered on it. Each $1,000 incremental bet would be represented by a marker that is used to specifically identify the player and the amount bet.

For instance, if a patron wished to place a full complete bet on 17, the player would call "17 to the maximum". This bet would require a total of 40 chips, or $40,000. To manually place the same wager, the player would need to bet:

17 to the maximum
Bet type	Number(s) bet on	Chips	Amount waged
Straight-up	17	1	$1,000
Split	14-17	2	$2,000
Split	16-17	2	$2,000
Split	17-18	2	$2,000
Split	17-20	2	$2,000
Street	16-17-18	3	$3,000
Corner	13-14-16-17	4	$4,000
Corner	14-15-17-18	4	$4,000
Corner	16-17-19-20	4	$4,000
Corner	17-18-20-21	4	$4,000
Six line	13-14-15-16-17-18	6	$6,000
Six line	16-17-18-19-20-21	6	$6,000
Total		40	$40,000

The player calls their bet to the croupier (most often after the ball has been spun) and places enough chips to cover the bet on the table within reach of the croupier. The croupier will immediately announce the bet (repeat what the player has just said), ensure that the correct monetary amount has been given while simultaneously placing a matching marker on the number on the table and the amount wagered.

The payout for this bet if the chosen number wins is 392 chips, in the case of a $1000 straight-up maximum, $40,000 bet, a payout of $392,000. The player's wagered 40 chips, as with all winning bets in roulette, are still their property and in the absence of a request to the contrary are left up to possibly win again on the next spin.

Based on the location of the numbers on the layout, the number of chips required to "complete" a number can be determined.

- Zero costs 17 chips to complete and pays 235 chips.
- Number 1 and number 3 each cost 27 chips and pay 297 chips.
- Number 2 is a 36-chip bet and pays 396 chips.
- 1st column numbers 4 to 31 and 3rd column numbers 6 to 33, cost 30 chips each to complete. The payout for a win on these 30-chip bets is 294 chips.
- 2nd column numbers 5 to 32 cost 40 chips each to complete. The payout for a win on these numbers is 392 chips.
- Numbers 34 and 36 each cost 18 chips and pay 198 chips.
- Number 35 is a 24-chip bet which pays 264 chips.

Most typically (Mayfair casinos in London and other top-class European casinos) with these maximum or full complete bets, nothing (except the aforementioned maximum button) is ever placed on the layout even in the case of a win. Experienced gaming staff, and the type of customers playing such bets, are fully aware of the payouts and so the croupier simply makes up the correct payout, announces its value to the table inspector (floor person in the U.S.) and the customer, and then passes it to the customer, but only after a verbal authorization from the inspector has been received.

Also typically at this level of play (house rules allowing) the experienced croupier caters to the needs of the customer and will most often add the customer's winning bet to the payout, as the type of player playing these bets very rarely bets the same number two spins in succession. For example, the winning 40-chip / $40,000 bet on "17 to the maximum" pays 392 chips / $392,000. The experienced croupier would pay the player 432 chips / $432,000, that is 392 + 40, with the announcement that the payout "is with your bet down".

There are also several methods to determine the payout when a number adjacent to a chosen number is the winner, for example, player bets "23 full complete" and number 26 is the winning number. The most notable method is known as the "station" method. When paying in stations, the dealer counts the number of ways or stations that the winning number hits the complete bet. In the example above, 26 hits 4 stations - 2 different corners, 1 split and 1 six-line. The dealer takes the number 4, multiplies it by 36, making 144 with the players bet down.

In some casinos, a player may bet full complete for less than the table straight-up maximum, for example, "number 17 full complete by $25" would cost $1000, that is 40 chips each at $25 value.

== Betting strategies and tactics ==
Over the years, many people have tried to beat the casino, and turn roulette—a game designed to turn a profit for the house—into one on which the player expects to win. Most of the time this comes down to the use of betting systems, strategies which say that the house edge can be beaten by simply employing a special pattern of bets, often relying on the "Gambler's fallacy", the idea that past results are any guide to the future (for example, if a roulette wheel has come up 10 times in a row on red, that red on the next spin is any more or less likely than if the last spin was black).

All betting systems that rely on patterns, when employed on casino edge games will result, on average, in the player losing money. In practice, players employing betting systems may win, and may indeed win very large sums of money, but the losses (which, depending on the design of the betting system, may occur quite rarely) will outweigh the wins. Certain systems, such as the Martingale, described below, are extremely risky, because the worst-case scenario (which is mathematically certain to happen, at some point) may see players chasing losses with ever-bigger bets until they run out of money.

The American mathematician Patrick Billingsley said that no betting system can convert a subfair game into a profitable enterprise. At least in the 1930s, some professional gamblers were able to consistently gain an edge in roulette by seeking out rigged wheels (not difficult to find at that time) and betting opposite the largest bets.

=== Prediction methods ===
Whereas betting systems are essentially an attempt to beat the fact that a geometric series with initial value of 0.95 (American roulette) or 0.97 (European roulette) will inevitably over time tend to zero, engineers instead attempt to overcome the house edge through predicting the mechanical performance of the wheel, most notably by Joseph Jagger at Monte Carlo in 1873. These schemes work by determining that the ball is more likely to fall at certain numbers. If effective, they raise the return of the game above 100%, defeating the betting system problem.

Edward O. Thorp (the developer of card counting and an early hedge-fund pioneer) and Claude Shannon (a mathematician and electronic engineer best known for his contributions to information theory) built the first wearable computer to predict the landing of the ball in 1961. This system worked by timing the ball and wheel, and using the information obtained to calculate the most likely octant where the ball would fall. Ironically, this technique works best with an unbiased wheel though it could still be countered quite easily by simply closing the table for betting before beginning the spin.

In 1982, several casinos in Britain began to lose large sums of money at their roulette tables to teams of gamblers from the US. Upon investigation by the police, it was discovered they were using a legal system of biased wheel-section betting. As a result of this, the British roulette wheel manufacturer John Huxley manufactured a roulette wheel to counteract the problem.

The new wheel, designed by George Melas, was called "low profile" because the pockets had been drastically reduced in depth, and various other design modifications caused the ball to descend in a gradual approach to the pocket area. In 1986, when a professional gambling team headed by Billy Walters won $3.8 million using the system on an old wheel at the Golden Nugget in Atlantic City, every casino in the world took notice, and within one year had switched to the new low-profile wheel.

Thomas Bass, in his book The Eudaemonic Pie (1985) (published as The Newtonian Casino in Britain), has claimed to be able to predict wheel performance in real time. The book describes the exploits of a group of University of California Santa Cruz students, who called themselves the Eudaemons, who in the late 1970s used computers in their shoes to win at roulette. This is an updated and improved version of Edward O. Thorp's approach, where Newtonian laws of motion are applied to track the roulette ball's deceleration; hence the British title.

To defend against exploits like these, many casinos use tracking software, use wheels with new designs, rotate wheel heads, and randomly rotate pocket rings.

At the Ritz London casino in March 2004, two Serbs and a Hungarian used a laser scanner hidden inside a mobile phone linked to a computer to predict the sector of the wheel where the ball was most likely to drop. They netted £1.3m in two nights. They were arrested and kept on police bail for nine months, but eventually released and allowed to keep their winnings as they had not interfered with the casino equipment.

=== Specific betting systems ===
The numerous even-money bets in roulette have inspired many players over the years to attempt to beat the game by using one or more variations of a martingale betting strategy, wherein the gambler doubles the bet after every loss, so that the first win would recover all previous losses, plus win a profit equal to the original bet. The problem with this strategy is that, remembering that past results do not affect the future, it is possible for the player to lose so many times in a row, that the player, doubling and redoubling their bets, either runs out of money or hits the table limit. A large financial loss is almost certain in the long term if the player continues to employ this strategy. Another strategy is the Fibonacci system, where bets are calculated according to the Fibonacci sequence. Regardless of the specific progression, no such strategy can statistically overcome the casino's advantage, since the expected value of each allowed bet is negative.

=== Types of betting system ===
Betting systems in roulette can be divided in to two main categories:

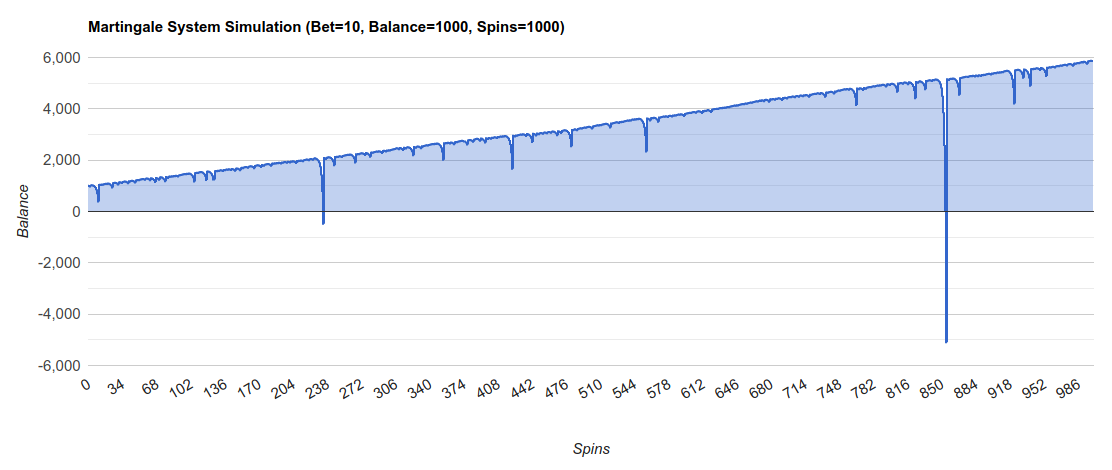
Negative progression system (e.g. Martingale)

Negative progression systems involve increasing the size of one's bet when they lose. This is the most common type of betting system. The goal of this system is to recoup losses faster so that one can return to a winning position more quickly after a losing streak. The typical shape of these systems is small but consistent wins followed by occasional catastrophic losses. Examples of negative progression systems include the Martingale system, the Fibonacci system, the Labouchère system, and the d'Alembert system.

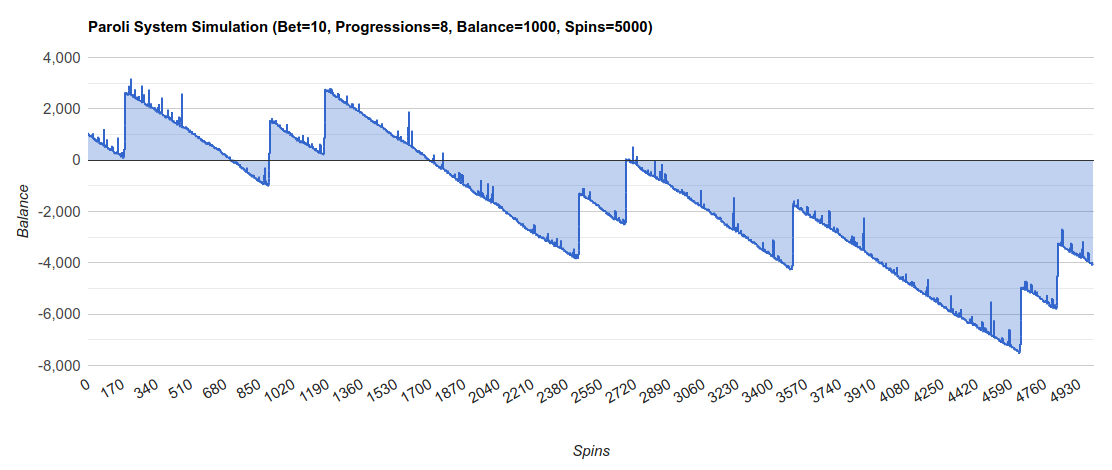
Positive progression system (e.g. Paroli)

Positive progression systems involve increasing the size of one's bet when one wins. The goal of these systems is to either exacerbate the effects of winning streaks (e.g. the Paroli system) or to take advantage of changes in luck to recover more quickly from previous losses (e.g. Oscar's grind). The shape of these systems is typically small but consistent losses followed by occasional big wins. However, over the long run these wins do not compensate for the losses incurred in between.

=== Reverse Martingale system ===
The Reverse Martingale system, also known as the Paroli system, follows the idea of the martingale betting strategy, but reversed. Instead of doubling a bet after a loss the gambler doubles the bet after every win. The system creates a false feeling of eliminating the risk of betting more when losing, but, in reality, it has the same problem as the martingale strategy. By doubling bets after every win, one keeps betting everything they have won until they either stop playing, or lose it all.

=== Labouchère system ===
The Labouchère System is a progression betting strategy like the martingale but does not require the gambler to risk their stake as quickly with dramatic double-ups. The Labouchere System involves using a series of numbers in a line to determine the bet amount, following a win or a loss. Typically, the player adds the numbers at the front and end of the line to determine the size of the next bet. If the player wins, they cross out numbers and continue working on the smaller line. If the player loses, then they add their previous bet to the end of the line and continue to work on the longer line. This is a much more flexible progression betting system and there is much room for the player to design their initial line to their own playing preference.

This system is one that is designed so that when the player has won over a third of their bets (less than the expected 18/38), they will win. Whereas the martingale will cause ruin in the event of a long sequence of successive losses, the Labouchère system will cause bet size to grow quickly even where a losing sequence is broken by wins. This occurs because as the player loses, the average bet size in the line increases.

As with all other betting systems, the average value of this system is negative.

=== D'Alembert system ===
The system, also called montant et demontant (from French, meaning upwards and downwards), is often called a pyramid system. It is based on a mathematical equilibrium theory devised by a French mathematician of the same name. Like the martingale, this system is mainly applied to the even-money outside bets, and is favored by players who want to keep the amount of their bets and losses to a minimum. The betting progression is very simple: After each loss, one unit is added to the next bet, and after each win, one unit is deducted from the next bet. Starting with an initial bet of, say, 1 unit, a loss would raise the next bet to 2 units. If this is followed by a win, the next bet would be 1 unit.

This betting system relies on the gambler's fallacy——that the player is more likely to lose following a win, and more likely to win following a loss.

=== Other systems ===
There are numerous other betting systems that rely on this fallacy, or that attempt to follow 'streaks' (looking for patterns in randomness), varying bet size accordingly.

Many betting systems are sold online and purport to enable the player to 'beat' the odds. One such system was advertised by Jason Gillon of Rotherham, UK, who claimed one could 'earn £200 daily' by following his betting system, described as a 'loophole'. As the system was advertised in the UK press, it was subject to Advertising Standards Authority regulation, and following a complaint, it was ruled by the ASA that Mr. Gillon had failed to support his claims, and that he had failed to show that there was any loophole.

== Notable winnings ==
- In the 1960s and early 1970s, Richard Jarecki won about $1.2 million at dozens of European casinos. He claimed that he was using a mathematical system designed on a powerful computer. In reality, he simply observed more than 10,000 spins of each roulette wheel to determine flaws in the wheels. Eventually the casinos realized that flaws in the wheels could be exploited, and replaced older wheels. The manufacture of roulette wheels has improved over time.
- In 1963 Sean Connery, filming From Russia with Love in Italy, attended the casino in Saint-Vincent and won three consecutive times on the number 17, his winnings riding on the second and third spins.
- In the early 1990s, Gonzalo García-Pelayo performed computer analysis on many roulette spins at the Casino de Madrid in Madrid, Spain, winning 600,000 euros in a single day, and two million euros in total. Legal action against him by the casino was unsuccessful, it being ruled that the casino should fix its wheel.
- In 2004, Ashley Revell of London sold all of his possessions, clothing included, and placed his entire net worth of US$135,300 on red (equivalent to $231,000 in 2025) at the Plaza Hotel in Las Vegas. The ball landed on "Red 7" and Revell walked away with $270,600.

== See also ==
- Bauernroulette
- Boule
- Eudaemons
- Monte Carlo Paradox
- Russian roulette
- Straperlo
- The Gambler, a novel written by Fyodor Dostoevsky inspired by his addiction to roulette
- Le multicolore; a game similar to roulette
