= Chaos: Making a New Science =

Nonfiction book by James Gleick

- 20th-anniversary edition
- Author: James Gleick
- Language: English
- Genre: Popular science
- Publisher: Viking Books
- Publication date: October 29, 1987
- Publication place: United States
- Media type: Print, e-book
- Pages: 400 pp.
- ISBN: 0-7493-8606-1
- OCLC: 59649776
- LC Class: Q172.5.C45 G54 1987
- Followed by: Nature's Chaos

Chaos: Making a New Science is a debut non-fiction book by James Gleick that initially introduced the principles and early development of the chaos theory to the public. It was a finalist for the National Book Award and the Pulitzer Prize in 1987, and was shortlisted for the Science Book Prize in 1989. The book was published on October 29, 1987 by Viking Books.

== Overview ==
Chaos: Making a New Science was the first popular book about chaos theory. It describes the Mandelbrot set, Julia sets, and Lorenz attractors without using complicated mathematics. It portrays the efforts of dozens of scientists whose separate work contributed to the developing field. The text remains in print and is widely used as an introduction to the topic for the mathematical layperson. The book approaches the history of chaos theory chronologically, starting with Edward Norton Lorenz and the butterfly effect, through Mitchell Feigenbaum, and ending with more modern applications.

The book covers chaos theory under the lens of four themes: sensitive dependence on initial conditions, self-similarity, universality, and nonlinearity.

An enhanced ebook edition was released by Open Road Media in 2011, adding embedded video and hyperlinked notes.

== Reception ==
Robert Sapolsky said, "Chaos is the first book since Baby Beluga where I've gotten to the last page and immediately started reading it over again from the front: I've found this to be the most influential book in my thinking about science since college."

Freeman Dyson praised the book for its popular account but critiqued the omitting of the earlier work of Dame Mary L. Cartwright and J. E. Littlewood in forming the foundation of chaos theory.
