= Walras =

Walras is a surname. Notable people with the surname include:

- Auguste Walras (1801–1866), French school administrator and amateur economist
- Léon Walras (1834–1910), French mathematical economist, son of Auguste

== See also ==
- Walrus (disambiguation)
