= James Harvey Rogers =

American economist (1886–1939)

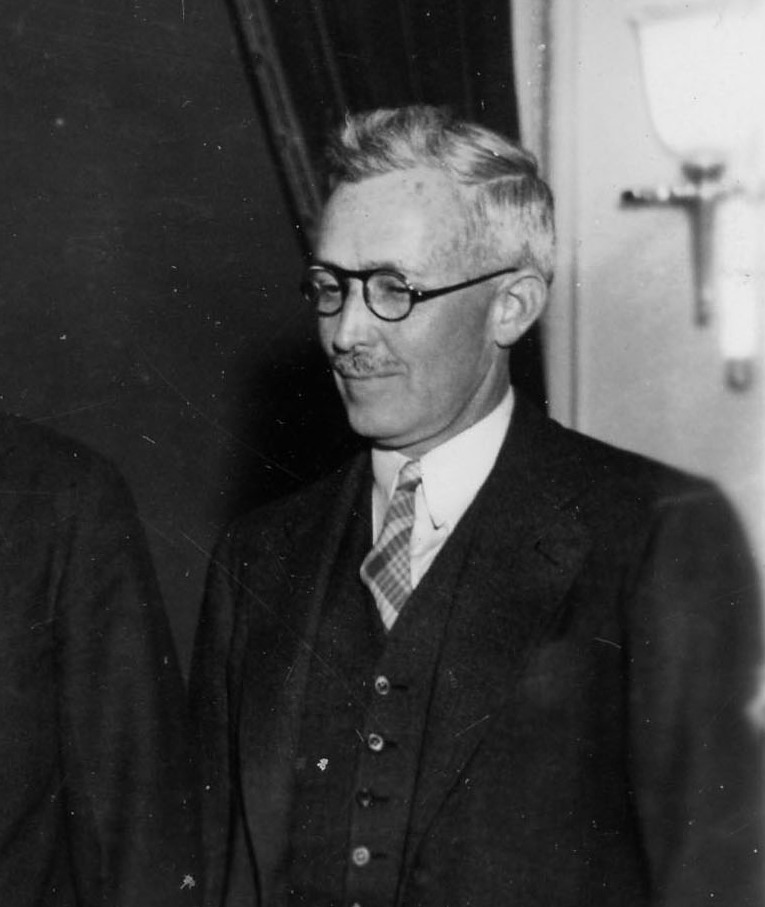
- Rogers in 1934
- Born: 25 September 1886; Society Hill, South Carolina, US
- Died: 13 August 1939 (aged 52); Rio de Janeiro, Brazil
- Known for: Advisor to Franklin D. Roosevelt

James Harvey Rogers (September 25, 1886 – August 13, 1939) was Yale University Sterling Professor of Economics from 1931 until his death in 1939. He was an adviser to President Franklin D. Roosevelt on monetary economics from 1933 to 1934. He was a student of Irving Fisher and Vilfredo Pareto and is considered Fisher's closest disciple and a proto-Keynesian.

== Early life and education ==
=== Family background ===
In 1743, Nicholas Rogers established a 350-acre plantation in the wilderness of Welsh Neck, east across the Great Pee Dee River from Society Hill, in the adjoining Marlboro County. Nicholas's grandson was Colonel Benjamin Rogers Jr., who fought in the American Revolution and was the father of 18 children and one step-child. James Harvey's father, John Terrell Rogers, was a fourth generation descendant of Nicholas Rogers. John was a captain in the Confederate Army by the age of 19 and, after the war, started his own plantation in Society Hill that he named Belle Vue. Rogers's first wife died in 1874 and he married Florence Coker, the youngest daughter of a prosperous store owner, in 1879.

=== Education ===
Rogers attended primary school at St. David's Academy where he was a mediocre, if diligent, student. In 1904, he enrolled at the College of South Carolina in Columbia. By starting as an advanced sophomore and taking large course loads, he was able to complete bachelor's degrees in both arts and sciences and a Master of Arts in mathematics and astronomy by 1907. At this point in his life, Rogers had not advanced beyond the sentimental, ethnocentric nationalism of the Southern landowning class. After graduating, he taught at St. David's Academy and was acting principal for one year before entering Yale University for a second bachelor's degree in 1909. He spent two years at the University of Chicago studying mathematics and astronomy. Studying under Alvin Johnson convinced Rogers to combine his interest in mathematics with economics. Nevertheless, he left unsatisfied and without earning a degree and returned to Yale. The death of his father in 1912 temporarily interrupted his education, but he received an M.A. in 1913. Owing to a sense of civic duty and an interest in social reform, he switched to political economy in the doctoral program. It was during his time at Yale that he began his study with Fisher.

For the 1914–1915 school year, Rogers was awarded Yale's Cyler Fellowship to study economics abroad. On Fisher's advice that Pareto was one of the foremost mathematical economists, Rogers went to the Geneva for his fellowship year. In 1893, Pareto had succeeded Léon Walras to the Chair of Political Economy at the University of Lausanne where he continued his work on general equilibrium theory. By 1914, Pareto was largely retired from teaching, but had finished his Trattato di sociologia generale (published in Italian in 1916; published in English as The Mind and Society in 1935) and was eager to lecture on his work. Pareto was living at his Villa Angora in the village of Céligny. For six months Rogers would "go out [to Céligny from Geneva] each Tuesday afternoon at five, listen to [Pareto] lecture for an hour, then discuss the matter for half an hour more, then eat a big French dinner and sit and talk until ten o'clock."

While in Europe, Rogers developed a method that he would employ throughout his career. Weak in theory and lacking the focus on detail necessary to produce the kind of data that was scarce in the pre-war era, Rogers traveled widely, established relationships, spoke to people with first-hand knowledge and cultivated his skills as an observer.

He completed his doctoral dissertation on Some Theories on the Incidence of Taxation in 1916.

=== First World War ===
Rogers was in Europe on his fellowship at the start of the First World War. Reading French, German and Italian newspapers imbued Rogers with a certain neutrality. The sinking of the Lusitania changed that. On 12 May 1915, he wrote to his mother that, prior to the Lusitania, "... hearing the Germans so unjustly run down in French Switzerland, I got in the habit of putting in a word for them now and then". After the Lusitania, he wrote, "I think I have spoken my last word in their favor." He also had his first taste of the mob. Witnessing demonstrations in Rome "knocked the last spark of Socialism out of my soul and with it most of my respect for the labor unions".

Upon returning to the United States and completing his dissertation, Rogers sought to continue in his family's martial tradition. He sought to enlist as a quartermaster in the Officers' Reserve Corps, but was rejected. He served with the Yale battalion along the Texas-Mexico border. He helped to enroll students in the American Ambulance Service thinking he would ship out to France with them but was again rejected. In fall 1917, he accepted a position as a statistician with the Priorities Committee of the Council of National Defense. He was shocked and dismayed to learn the state of U.S. unpreparedness, administrative disorganization, the paucity of information on the economy and the unwillingness of business to co-operate. He opposed direct government control of the economy and sought instead the creation of a system of priorities. With the routinization of management, he left the council and was commissioned a first lieutenant in the Ordnance Reserve Corps in January 1918 and sent to Europe.

After the Armistice in November, the War Department sent him to work with the War Industries Board. Wesley C. Mitchell, was the foremost U.S. expert on business cycles. Mitchell needed a statistician to help with the publication, History of Prices During the War, a compilation into a uniform format of the price data gathered by the government during the war. Rogers authored Bulletin Number 23 in the project, "Prices of Cotton and Cotton Products", in 1919.

Eager to return to Europe, in April 1919 Rogers joined the Red Cross. He spent two and a half months working in Paris. In late July, he went to Czechoslovakia and returned to the U.S. in the fall.

He had absorbed a good deal of Pareto's pessimism and was an admirer of such works as The Adding Machine and the essays of H. L. Mencken, as well as having witnessed first-hand the destruction in Europe, but Rogers did not share the disillusion of fellow intellectuals of the Lost Generation. Rather, he remained optimistic about the possibilities of U.S. business culture, democracy, altruism and scientific rationalism.

== Academic economist ==
Rogers was an instructor in economics in 1916 and then an associate professor in 1919 at the University of Missouri. He then was an assistant professor in economics at Cornell University from 1920 to 1923 before returning to the University of Missouri, where he was a full professor from 1923 to 1930. He was appointed a professor of political economy in 1930 and, in 1931, the Sterling Professor of Political Economy at Yale University, retaining that professorial chair until his sudden death in 1939. He was an Invited Speaker of the ICM in 1924 at Toronto.

== Government economist ==
While continuously employed as a university professor, Rogers also gave advice and service to the Roosevelt administration. He advised the administration on fiscal policy from 1933 to 1934, was a special representative of the U. S. Treasury Department in the Far East in 1934, and was the American member of the Economic Committee of the League of Nations from 1933 to 1937. In 1934, Rogers was sent on behalf of the Treasury to study the monetary systems of China, Japan, and India.

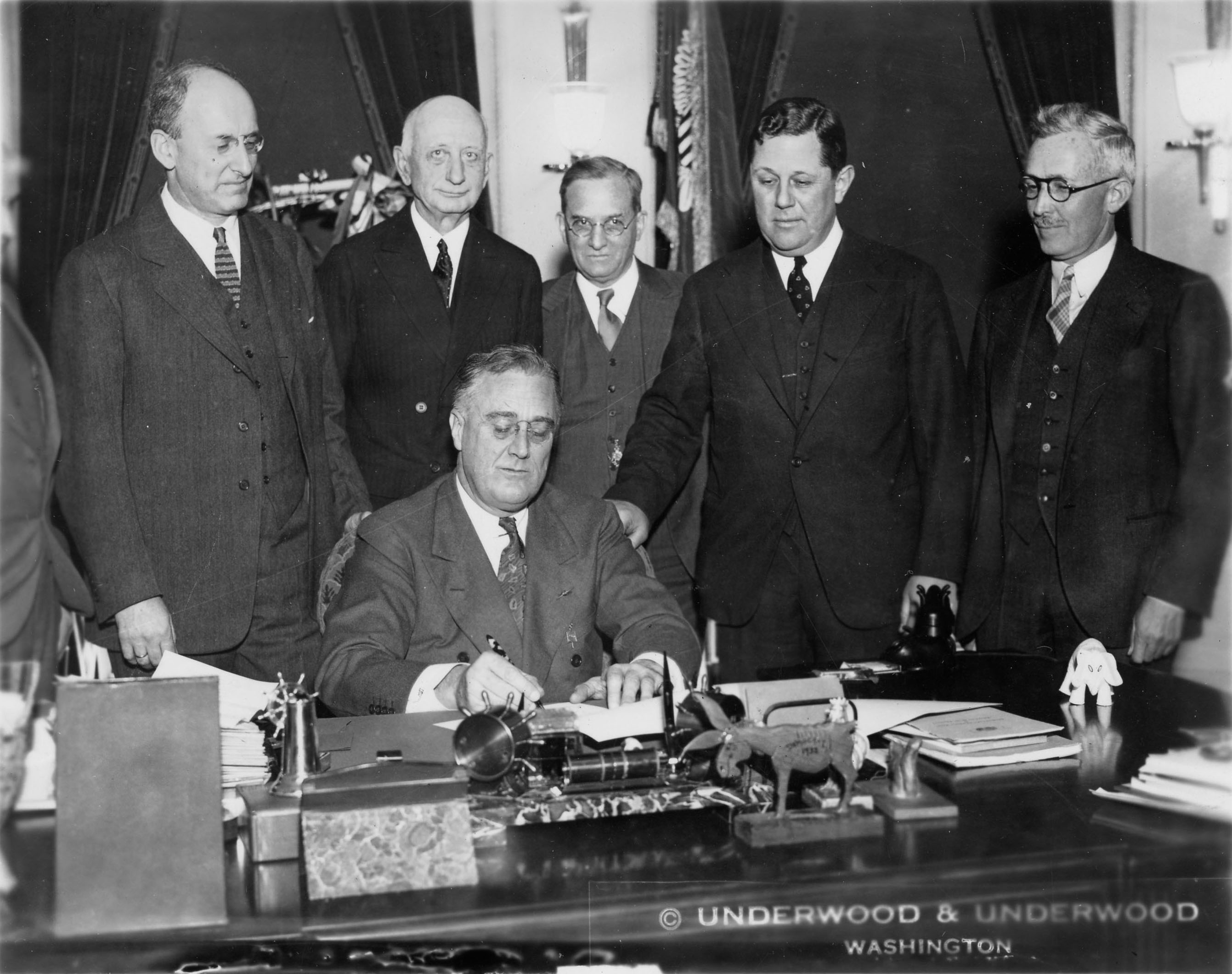
Left to right: Henry Morgenthau Jr., Eugene R. Black, George F. Warren, Samuel Rosman and James Harvey Rogers attend as President Roosevelt signs the Gold Reserve Act into law, 30 January 1934

== Death ==
On 13 August 1939, while on a mission to investigate the status of the Brazilian economy in the Hemispheric Defense Zone, his airplane crashed in the vicinity of Rio de Janeiro. At Roger's pre-arrangement, he is buried in the Welsh Neck Baptist Church Cemetery in Society Hill.

== Legacy ==
The University of Missouri-Columbia has a James Harvey Rogers Chair of Money, Credit and Banking. The James Harvey Rogers papers are available at the Manuscripts and Archives Division of the Sterling Memorial Library at Yale University.

== Bibliography ==
=== Works by James Harvey Rogers ===
- Rogers, James Harvey (May 1926). "The Effect of Stock Speculation on the New York Money Market". Quarterly Journal of Economics. 40 (3). Oxford University Press: 435–462. doi:10.2307/1885173. JSTOR 1885173.
- Rogers, James Harvey (1927). Stock Speculation and the Money Market. Columbia, Mo.: Lucas Brothers.
- Rogers, James Harvey (1928). "Vilfredo Pareto: the Mathematician of the Social Sciences" (PDF). In Fields, John Charles (ed.). Proceedings of the International Mathematical Congress held in Toronto, August 11-16, 1924. Vol. II. Toronto: The University of Toronto Press. pp. 969–972. Archived from the original (PDF) on 2015-01-05.
- Rogers, James Harvey (1929). "Foreign Markets and Foreign Credit" (PDF). In Parker, William N. (ed.). Report of the Committee on Recent Economic Changes, of the President's Conference on Unemployment. New York: National Bureau of Economic Research / McGraw-Hill Book Company, Inc. pp. 709–756. ISBN 0-87014-012-4.
- Rogers, James Harvey; Maffry, August; Landman, Robert E. (1929). The Process of Inflation in France, 1914-1927. New York: Columbia University Press.
- Rogers, James Harvey; Edmiston, Henry H.; Helm, Florence (1931). America Weighs Her Gold. New Haven, Conn.: Yale University Press.
- Rogers, James Harvey (29 January 1932). "Federal Reserve Policy and the Gold Standard". In Norman Wait Harris Foundation (ed.). Reports of Round Tables: Gold and Monetary Stabilization. Chicago, Ill.: University of Chicago. pp. 148–191.
- Rogers, James Harvey (May 1932). "Foreign Credits and International Trade". Proceedings of the Academy of Political Science. 15 (1). Academy of Political Science: 6–12. doi:10.2307/1172736. JSTOR 1172736.
- Rogers, James Harvey (September 1932). "Gold, International Credits and Depression". Journal of the American Statistical Association. 27 (179). American Statistical Association: 237–250. doi:10.1080/01621459.1932.10502614. JSTOR 2278157.
- Rogers, James Harvey (January 1933). "The Absorption of Bank Credit". Econometrica. 1 (1). Econometric Society: 63–70. doi:10.2307/1912231. JSTOR 1912231.
- Rogers, James Harvey (March 1933). "Federal Reserve Policy in World Monetary Chaos". The American Economic Review. Supplement, Papers and Proceedings of the Forty-Fifth Annual Meeting of the American Economic Association. 23 (1). Economic Association: 119–129. JSTOR 53.
- Rogers, James Harvey (May 1936). "The Prospect of Inflation in the United States". Proceedings of the Academy of Political Science. 17 (1). Academy of Political Science: 128–135. doi:10.2307/1172423. JSTOR 1172423.
- Rogers, James Harvey (July 1936). "The Problem of International Monetary Stabilization". The Annals of the American Academy of Political and Social Science. 186. Sage / American Academy of Political and Social Science: 34–40. doi:10.1177/000271623618600107. JSTOR 1020604. S2CID 143776508.
- Rogers, James Harvey (1937). "Monetary Initiative in a Traditional World". In Gayer, Arthur D. (ed.). The Lessons of Monetary Experience. New York: Farrar and Rinehart. pp. 99–116.
- Rogers, James Harvey (1938). Capitalism in Crisis. New Haven, Conn.: Yale University Press.

=== Secondary sources ===
- Bruchey, Stuart (February 2000). "Rogers, James Harvey". American National Biography Online. American Council of Learned Societies. Archived from the original on 12 March 2016. Alt URL
- R.C.J. (December 1939). "James Harvey Rogers, 1886–1939". The American Economic Review. 29 (4). American Economic Association: 913–914. JSTOR 1804220.
- Jones, Byrd Luther (April 1966). James Harvey Rogers: An Intellectual Biography, 1886–1939 (Ph.D.). Yale University. OCLC 4251001. ProQuest 302194633.
- "Attack on Credit is Seen by Woodin; The Secretary Says Sprague Implies Government Bonds Are 'Bad' Securities". New York Times. New York. 23 November 1933.
- Steindl, Frank G. (1995). Monetary Interpretations of the Great Depression. Ann Arbor, Mich.: University of Michigan Press. ISBN 0-472-10600-7.
- Sweezy, Alan (March 1972). "The Keynesians and Government Policy, 1933-1939". The American Economic Review. 6 (1/2). American Economic Association: 116–124. JSTOR 1821531.
- Wolfers, Arnold, ed. (1940). James Harvey Rogers, 1886-1939; In Memoriam. Stamford, Conn.: The Overbrook Press. OCLC 478965727.
