= Generative science =

Study of nature's complex behaviour systems

Interaction between a few simple rules and parameters can produce endless, seemingly unpredictable complexity.

Generative science is an area of research that explores the natural world and its complex behaviours. It explores ways "to generate apparently unanticipated and infinite behaviour based on deterministic and finite rules and parameters reproducing or resembling the behavior of natural and social phenomena". By modelling such interactions, it can suggest that properties exist in the system that had not been noticed in the real world situation. An example field of study is how unintended consequences arise in social processes.

Generative sciences often explore natural phenomena at several levels of organization. Self-organizing natural systems are a central subject, studied both theoretically and by simulation experiments. The study of complex systems in general has been grouped under the heading of "general systems theory", particularly by Ludwig von Bertalanffy, Anatol Rapoport, Ralph Gerard, and Kenneth Boulding.

== Scientific and philosophical origins ==
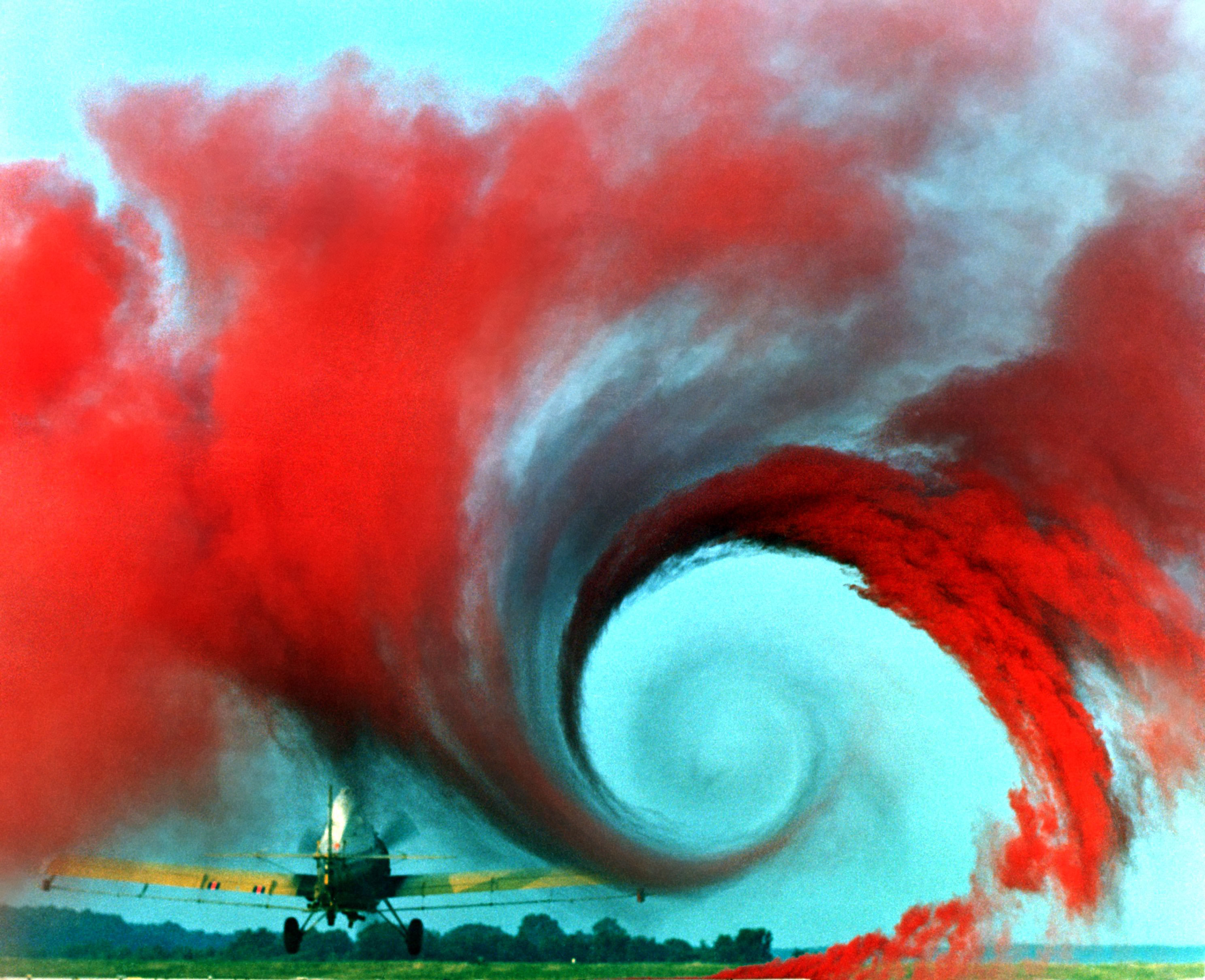
Turbulence in the tip vortex from an airplane wing. Studies of the critical point beyond which a system creates turbulence were important for chaos theory, analyzed for example by the Soviet physicist Lev Landau who developed the Landau-Hopf theory of turbulence. David Ruelle and Floris Takens later predicted, against Landau, that fluid turbulence could develop through a strange attractor, a main concept of chaos theory.

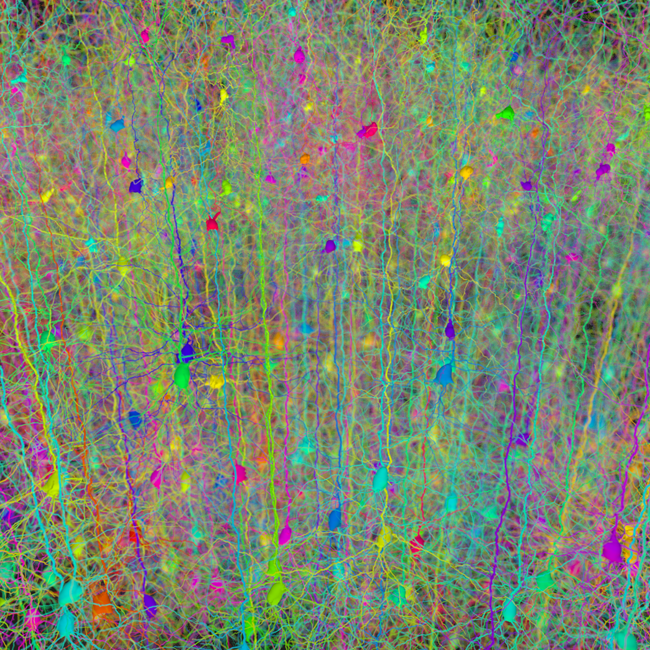
Computer simulation of the branching architecture of the dendrites of pyramidal neurons.

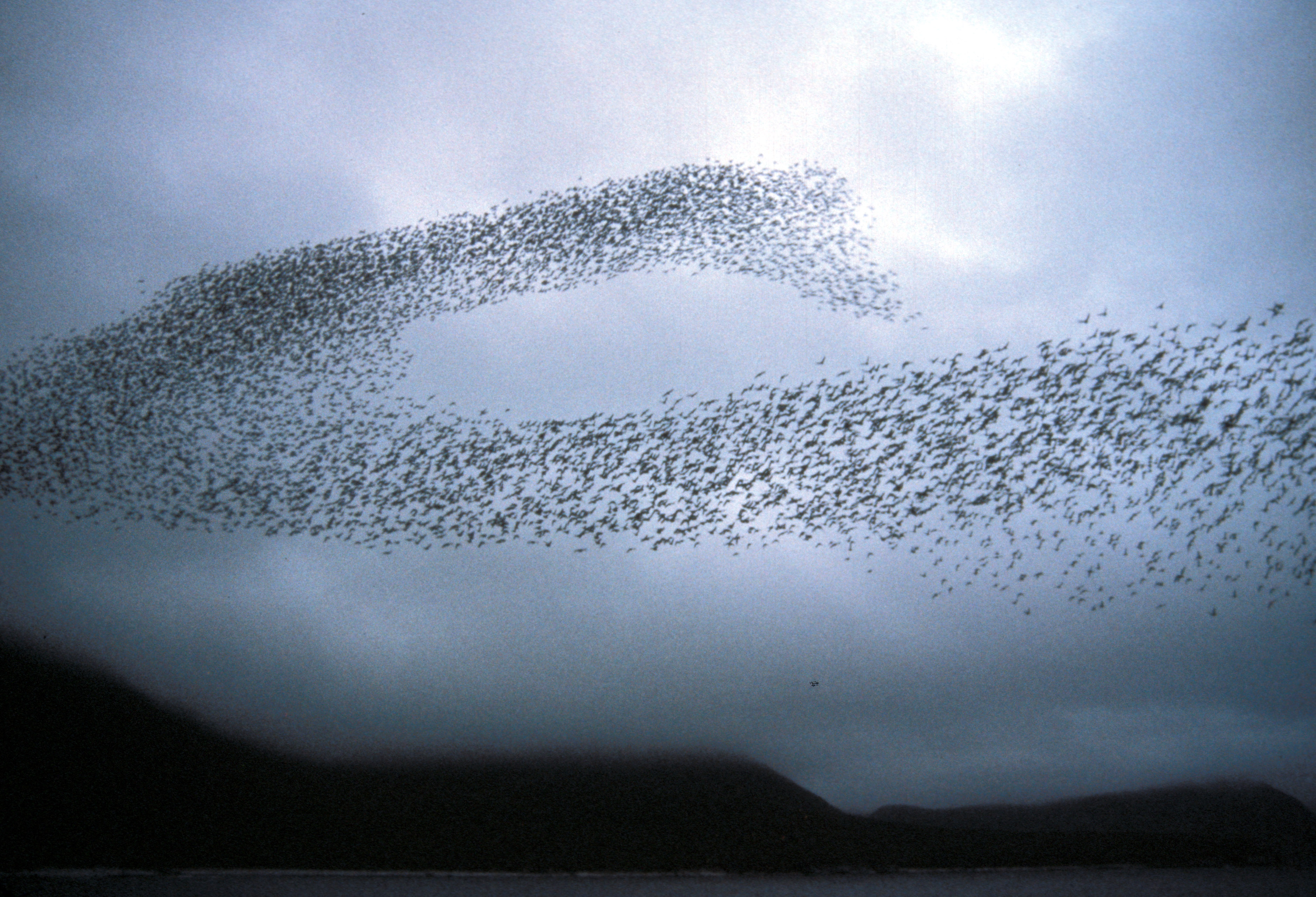
The natural phenomenon of herd behaviour as in a flock of birds can be modelled artificially using simple rules in individual units, with swarm intelligence rather than any centralized control.

The development of computers and automata theory laid a technical foundation for the growth of the generative sciences. For example:

- Cellular automata are mathematical representations of simple entities interacting under deterministic rules to manifest complex behaviours. They can be used to model emergent processes of the physical universe, neural cognitive processes and social behavior.
  - Conway's Game of Life is a zero-player game based on cellular automata, meaning that the only input is in setting the initial conditions, and the game is to see how the system evolves.
  - In 1996 Joshua M. Epstein and Robert Axtell wrote the book Growing Artificial Societies which proposes a set of automaton rules and a system called Sugarscape which models a population dependent on resources (called sugar).
- Artificial neural networks attempt to solve problems in the same way that the human brain would, although they are still several orders of magnitude less complex than the human brain and closer to the computing power of a worm. Advances in the understanding of the human brain often stimulate new patterns in neural networks.

One of the most influential advances in the generative sciences as related to cognitive science came from Noam Chomsky's (1957) development of generative grammar, which separated language generation from semantic content, and thereby revealed important questions about human language. It was also in the early 1950s that psychologists at the MIT including Kurt Lewin, Jacob Levy Moreno and Fritz Heider laid the foundations for group dynamics research which later developed into social network analysis.

== See also ==
- Generative systems – Technologies that can produce change driven by audiences
