= The Mind and Society =

1916 book by Vilfredo Pareto

- Italian cover
- Author: Vilfredo Pareto
- Original title: Trattato di Sociologia Generale
- Translator: Andrew Bongiorno, Arthur Livingston, James Harvey Rogers
- Language: Italian
- Subject: Sociology
- Genre: Nonfiction
- Publication date: 1916
- English publication date: 1935
- Media type: Print
- Pages: 2,033

The Mind and Society (Italian: Trattato di Sociologia Generale, lit. "Treatise on General Sociology") is a 1916 book by the Italian sociologist and economist Vilfredo Pareto (1848–1923). In this book Pareto presents the first sociological cycle theory, centered on the concept of an elite social class.

The Mind and Society has been named, by Martin Seymour-Smith, as one of the most influential books ever written. The English edition was published in 1935. An abridged version, Compendium of General Sociology (Italian: Compendio di Sociologia Generale), was published in Italian in 1920 and English in 1980.

== Release ==
The book was first published in Italian in 1916, then in French between 1917 and 1919. A second Italian edition was released in 1923. An English edition, titled The Mind and Society: A Treatise on General Sociology, was released in 1935.

== Summary ==
The book characterises human acts as mostly 'non-logical': not conducive to an intended goal. However, it notes how people try to explain such conduct as logical anyway, and these explanations have developed into many magical, metaphysical, and moral theories. The author identifies categories of instinctive tendencies behind such theories, including 'combinations' (creative syntheses, such as superstitious associations) and 'group-persistences' (deeply held preconceptions, such as belief in a god or reified abstraction like Justice or Progress).

He then investigates how the sentiments that motivate these tendencies affect the prosperity of a society. Here, the author sees the relative intensities of these sentiments in a population, especially those of combinations versus those of group-persistences, as an important social force. In his view, this force acts on and reacts to other forces, such as economic factors, as part a dynamic social system in which cyclic patterns are noticed. For example, the economic ingenuity spurred by the instinct for combinations is a cause of and is rewarded in times of increasing economic prosperity, but this instinct also leads to the financial manipulation that is one cause of later periods of economic decline, during which a society relies more on those who had the instinct to save money, motivated by the sentiments of group-persistence.

Another such pattern is the circulation of elite: the instinct for combinations among the elite social class allows it to find ways to improve societal prosperity, incentivising an increasing dominance of those sentiments in the elite to the detriment of the group-persistences, leaving them less able or willing to justify the use of force and thus vulnerable to replacement by a new elite, especially if they do not allow such highly capable individuals a chance to enter the elite more freely, and thus a new elite able to arouse sentiments of group-persistences in the masses tends to take over.
