= Object Oriented Management =

Management model

Object-oriented management is a model for management and for project management. The objective of object-oriented management is to provide a clear set of principles set into a framework that enables all participants while minimizing management overhead.

== Overview ==
The primary objective of object-oriented management is Total Quality as defined by the client and/or the end-user(s). This is achieved by real-time management of projects. Object-oriented management integrates many concepts from lightweight methodologies like Agile and Lean, such as empowered teams, small and fast iterations of work. It also applies the Pareto principle and a view of all activities in terms of objects and agents, where agents act upon objects and interact with one another.

Object-oriented management involves organizing the relevant, current, business objects into an efficient structure that best reflects the organization's relationship with these objects, and assigning responsibility for these objects to agents.

== Concepts ==
=== Aiming for total quality, as fast as possible, at the lowest cost ===
The objective of object-oriented management is to obtain results that meet Total Quality, while making sure that the timeline and costs are minimal. Total Quality is defined as the quality of the results from the client's point of view.

=== Objects and the tree structure ===
From the perspective of object-oriented management, every aspect of the project is an object. Part of the art is to identify those objects that are relevant to your context, within your organization.

==== Object ====
Objects can be static or dynamic. Static objects are unchanging unless acted upon, while dynamic objects are able to modify the state of other objects.

Static objects
Divisions, teams, money, defined processes, portfolios, information, libraries, messages, emails, pay, forms, meetings, discussion items, physical materials (ex. computers), physical space, projects, tasks, etc.
Dynamic objects
Agents, organizations, groups, humans, animals, the sun, water, life-cycle, etc.

==== Tree structure ====
In object-oriented management, objects are connected to one another according to their relationship. The visualization of these relationships can be said to resemble the branching out of a tree, from more general objects to more specific ones. The tree structure also represents the interrelation of objects within your project.

=== Agents: managers, experts, clients ===
From an object-oriented management perspective, each participant of a project is an agent. As with objects, an organization would concern itself with the agents with which it interacts.

==== Agent ====
Agents tend to be dynamic, interacting with one another, and with objects. They have the ability to transform dynamic and static objects.

- Staff: Employees, Managers, Interns, Part-time, etc.
- Downstream Users: Clients, Customers, End-users
- Upstream Users: Suppliers, Funding Sources, Regulating Agencies

=== Iterations and the 80-zone efficiency ===
Object-oriented management shares the lightweight methodology emphasis on frequent, short and productive iterations. It goes on to define « short and productive » in terms of the Pareto principle and staying in 80-Zone Efficiency.

==== Iteration ====
Iteration is a set of actions between a starting point and a result, including feedback from the client or expert. Object-oriented management integrates best market practices around the delivery of work into rapid iterations, like found in the Agile software development and other iteration-based methodologies.

==== 80-zone efficiency ====
The state of knowing when we are in a state of high productivity, recognizing when we are about to leave this state, and having the discipline to move on to the next phase of the success loop before leaving 80-Zone Efficiency, or else as soon as we notice we are no longer in it.

=== Interface ===
This concept was inspired from object-oriented programming. The interface defines the layer of communication between an object and anything in its environment. The interface consists of inputs (often called resources), and outputs (often called results). Defining the interface is an art that highly skilled object-oriented management agents master.
