= Winiarski =

Winiarski is a Polish surname. Notable people with the surname include:

- Bohdan Winiarski (1884–1969), Polish politician and jurist
- Ed Winiarski (1911–1975), American comic book writer
- Leon Winiarski (1865–1915), Polish sociologist
- Michał Winiarski (born 1983), Polish volleyball player
- Warren Winiarski (1928–2024), American winemaker
