= Lausanne School =

Neoclassical-economics school of thought

The Lausanne School of economics, sometimes referred to as the Mathematical School, refers to the neoclassical economics school of thought surrounding Léon Walras and Vilfredo Pareto. It is named after the University of Lausanne, at which both Walras and Pareto held professorships. Polish economist Leon Winiarski is also said to have been a member of the Lausanne School.

== Background ==
The term Lausanne School was coined by the mathematician Hermann Laurent in his article Petit traite d'economie politique mathematique (Small Treatise on Mathematical Political Economy). The central feature of the Lausanne School was its development of general equilibrium theory. Laurent's article presented a simplified version of this theory.

Lausanne School is also associated with the Italian School and the Paretian School, which were based on the works of Pareto. Italian economic historians have adopted Luigi Einaudi's description that the age of the Lausanne School in Italy should be called "Italian school". The school is distinguished from the work of Alfred Marshall by the way it maintains the necessity of considering the interaction of all parts of the economy simultaneously so that the behavior that occurs within any part of it can be understood. Marshall, on the other hand, preferred to solve economic problems using mathematics as the instrument, with the theorist drawing out conclusions instead of coming up with solutions through the process of verbal reasoning.

The Lausanne School attempted to answer the question of whether the welfare of an economy can be measured. Its theorists such as Walras proposed that it can be done through a notion of justice in exchange called "commutative justice", which required all traders to face the same price, which did not change, for a given product. This free competition is said to produce "maximum welfare", allowing for an effective evaluation of questions of welfare. Hans Mayer argued against Lausanne School, citing that its assumptions are unrealistic and that the utility of a good cannot be measured, infinitely divided, nor indefinitely substituted.

Members of the Lausanne School include Basile Samsonoff, Marie Kolabinska, and Pierre Boven, who were all students of Pareto.
