= Summum Bonum (poem) =

1889 poem by Robert Browning

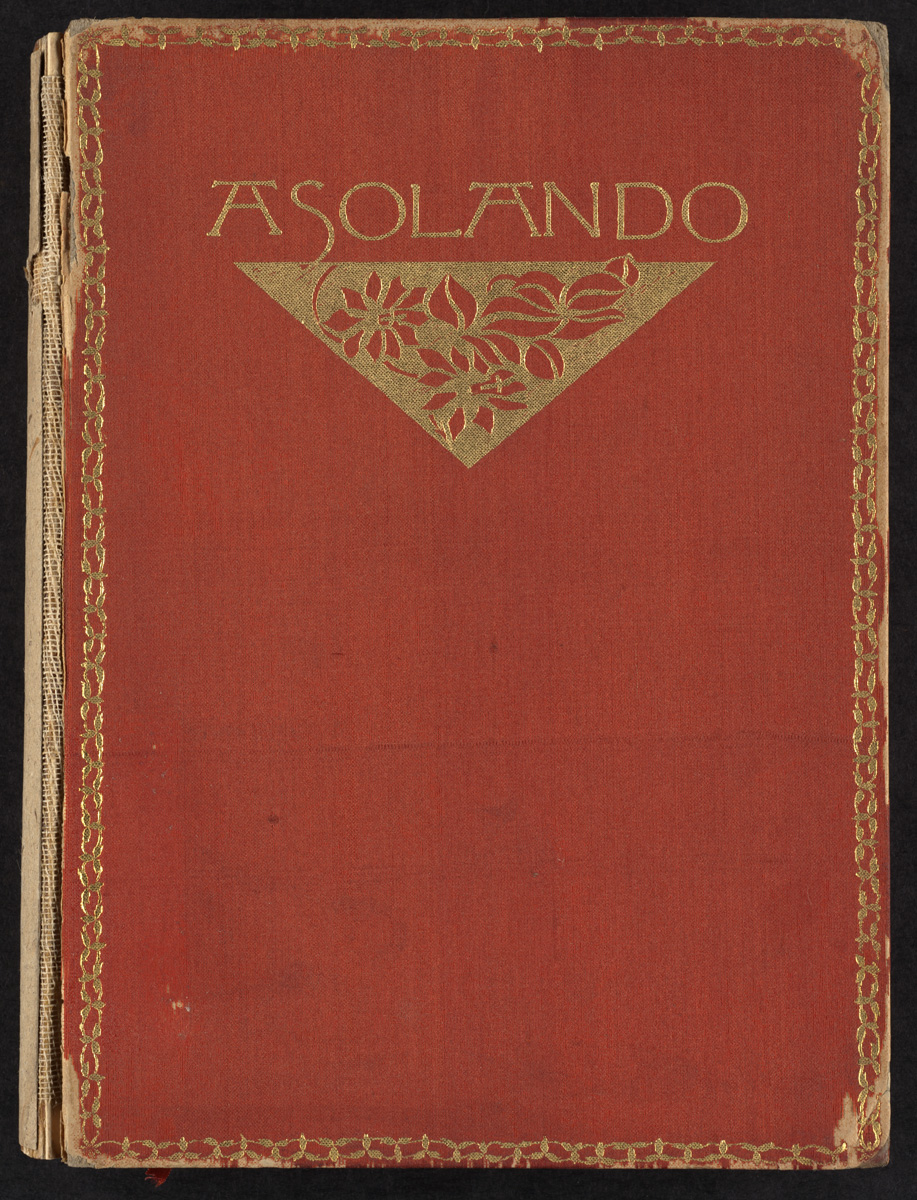
Asolando by Robert Browning

"Summum Bonum" is a poem by Robert Browning. It was published in the poet's last book, Asolando, in 1889. It is a short poem or epigram. The title is a Latin phrase that means the highest good.

== Form ==
The poem is composed of eight lines. They are not equally long. Some are fifteen syllables long, while others are only six syllables long. The metre is anapaestic. The longer lines are built of five feet:

x x / x x / x x / x x / x x /

and the shorter of only two feet:

x x / x x /

while Browning frequently employs what might be considered cretic substitutions:

  /    x     /      /   x     /     /  x    /
Breath and bloom, shade and shine, wonder, wealth...

The lines rhyme according to the scheme ABABBCAC and also feature alliteration.

== Text ==
All the breath and the bloom of the year in the bag of one bee:
All the wonder and wealth of the mine in the heart of one gem:
In the core of one pearl all the shade and the shine of the sea:
Breath and bloom, shade and shine,—wonder, wealth, and—how far above them—
Truth, that's brighter than gem,
Trust, that's purer than pearl,—
Brightest truth, purest trust in the universe—all were for me
In the kiss of one girl.

== Critical reception ==
A Polish sociologist, Leon Winiarski, who was active at the end of the 19th century, was disgusted with the poem. In his view, Browning should not have written it, writing: "We have to laugh, when we read that this eighty-year-old man standing at the edge of a grave thinks that the greatest happiness in life is in 'kissing a girl'."

== Bibliography ==
- Robert Browning, Asolando: fancies and facts, London 1890.
