= Pareto priority index =

Index used to prioritize projects

The Pareto priority index (PPI) is an index used to prioritize several (quality improvement) projects. It is named for its connection with the Pareto principle named after the economist Vilfredo Pareto. It is especially used in the surroundings of Six Sigma projects. It was first established by AT&T. The PPI is calculated as follows:

$$\text{PPI} = \frac{\text{savings} \times \text{probability of success}}{\text{cost} \times \text{time of completion}}$$

A high PPI suggests a high project priority.
