= Pareto's law =

Pareto's law is either of the following closely related ideas:

- Pareto principle or law of the vital few, stating that 80% of the effects come from 20% of the causes
- Pareto distribution, a power-law probability distribution used in description of many types of observable phenomena
