= The Rise and Fall of the Elites =

1900 book by Vilfredo Pareto

- Author: Vilfredo Pareto
- Original title: Un'applicazione di teorie sociologiche
- Language: Italian
- Genre: essay
- Publication date: 1900
- Publication place: Italy
- English publication date: 1968
- Pages: 52

The Rise and Fall of the Elites: An Application of Theoretical Sociology (Italian: Un'applicazione di teorie sociologiche) is a 1900 book by the Italian writer Vilfredo Pareto. It is a study of elites, exploring Pareto's conception of the circulation of elites. It marked a change in Pareto's area of interest from econometrics to sociology.

It was first published as an essay in the Rivista italiana di sociologia in July 1900. It was published in English translation by Bedminster Press of Totowa, New Jersey in 1968.
