= Walrus (disambiguation) =

A walrus is a large, flippered marine mammal.

Walrus may also refer to:

== Music ==
- "Walrus", a song by the industrial metal band Ministry, from their 2004 album Houses of the Molé
- "Walrus", a song by the punk rock band Unwritten Law, from their 2005 album Here's to the Mourning

== People ==
- Barry White, popularly known as "The Walrus of Love"
- Craig Stadler, professional PGA Tour golfer, popularly known as "The Walrus"

== Places ==
- Walrus Islands, a group of craggy coastal islands in the Bering Sea
- Walrus Island (Bathurst Inlet, Nunavut), an island in Nunavut, Canada
- Walrus Island, Pribilof Islands, a small island in Alaska, United States

== Transport ==
=== Aviation ===
- Supermarine Walrus, a British amphibious aircraft of World War II
- Westland Walrus, a British reconnaissance aircraft of the 1920s
- Walrus HULA, a heavy-lift hybrid airship studied by the American Defense Advanced Research Projects Administration (DARPA)

=== Maritime ===
- HNLMS Walrus, two submarines of the Royal Netherlands Navy
- HMS Walrus, the name of two ships and one submarine of the Royal Navy
- SS Walrus, a 19th-century vessel that operated in Australia as a floating, illegal moonshine still before being replaced by the legal Beenleigh Rum Distillery
- USS Walrus, three submarines of the United States Navy
- Walrus-class submarine, a type of submarine currently operated by the Royal Netherlands Navy
- Walrus (1851 HBC vessel), a Hudson's Bay Company vessel, 1851–1857
- Walrus (1872 HBC vessel), a Hudson's Bay Company vessel, 1872–1876

=== Other transport ===
- Walrus (locomotive), a narrow–gauge, diesel locomotive on the Groudle Glen Railway
- An ITSO smartcard issued by Merseytravel in the UK

== Other uses ==
- Wally Walrus, an animated character in several Woody Woodpecker films
- The Walrus, a Canadian general interest magazine
- Walrus (Marvel Comics), a minor Marvel Comics supervillain of Spider-Man
- A storage service included with Eucalyptus software
- Walrus moustache, a style of moustache that resembles the whiskers of the walrus
- WLRS, known as "The Walrus" (1964–2000), a radio station in Louisville, Kentucky, with a frequency currently having call sign WXMA
- An informal term for the operator :=, used in mathematics and programming languages such as Pascal for assignment

== See also ==
- Léon Walras, French economist
- "I Am the Walrus", a 1967 song by the Beatles
- "The Walrus and the Carpenter", a poem by Lewis Carroll that appeared in his book Through the Looking-Glass
