= Progressive theory of capital =

The progressive theory of capital is an economic theory posited by Léon Walras in 1874 in part 5 of his book Elements of Pure Economics.

== See also ==
- Capital (economics)
- Capital goods
- Capital services
- Capital stocks
- Walras-Cassel System
- Walrasian General Equilibrium Theory
- Capital and Investment Theory
- Léon Walras
