= Ophelimity =

Ophelimity (from Greek ophelimos "useful") is an economic concept introduced by Vilfredo Pareto as a measure of purely economic satisfaction, so he could use the already well-established term utility as a measure of a more broad-based satisfaction encompassing other dimensions as well, such as the ethical, moral, religious, and political. As such, it corresponds to the sense in which utility is often used in economic calculations. Irving Fisher proposed replacing ophelimity (and thus utility as it is commonly construed) with the term wantability.

== Ugo Spirito ==
Ugo Spirito, according to professor A. James Gregor, used the term 'Ophelimity' to mean "the individual's satisfaction (of which) he is the only judge." - "Making the individual's satisfaction unique, and impossible to compare over time or intersubjectively." Reducing fundamental social & economic reality to a consideration of interaction among what was identified as 'windowless monads' by Cartesians. This places Spirito's use in apparent reverse of Pareto's particular verbal utilization, and as he meant it the hallmark of the corporatist-syndicalist idea of 'totalitarianism', that becomes a "total-state" by virtue of it systematizing every interest, where incorporated, as a public reflection (in the state government) of the syndicate's particular unique will to socially organize by sphere of voluntary guild followship. For there to then have their private contribution made thus a public corporation in the state whole. Such factional syndicate interests being unknowable (in the Gentilean sense) without the cohesion of what would be an overall state. Which could only be conceived as the natural process of association necessitated, in how it is made into a past established instance, that such a state then self-identifies in the flux of personal & social variegation to realize itself. This would make public & private spheres reciprocally codified, state & each faction, as they are at the present for all representation of further aggregates accruing beyond the horizon of state systematization on into the future. This program existing in purposeful contrast to all economic, material & atomistic appropriation by intellectuals of contrasted socialistic theory then at odds with the Italian Fascism of Spirito, such as Communism & classical liberalism.

== See also ==
- Social preferences
