= Arthur Livingston =

Arthur Livingston (September 30, 1883 in Northbridge, Massachusetts – 1944), was an American professor of Romance languages and literatures, translator, and publisher, who played a significant role in introducing a number of European writers to readers in the United States in the period between World War I and World War II.

== Biography ==
Arthur Livingston earned his A.B. at Amherst College in 1904, and received a doctorate in Romance languages from Columbia University in 1910.

Livingston taught Italian at Smith College (1908-1909) and at Cornell University (1910-1911). He was associate professor of Romance Languages at Columbia University (1911-1917).

During World War I, Arthur Livingston was an editor with the Foreign Press Bureau of the Committee on Public Information. After the war he co-founded with Paul Kennaday and Ernest Poole the Foreign Press Service, which represented foreign authors in English-language markets. He persuaded many American publishers that it was possible to create a market for the work of European authors in the United States. Livingston helped introduce to the United States the work of Octave Aubry, Vicente Blasco Ibáñez, Giuseppe Antonio Borgese, Benedetto Croce, Claude Farrère, Guglielmo Ferrero, André Maurois, Alberto Moravia, Gaetano Mosca, Giovanni Papini, Vilfredo Pareto, Luigi Pirandello, Giuseppe Prezzolini, and Guido da Verona.

In 1926 Livingston returned to academia, becoming Professor of Romance Languages at Columbia University in 1935.

== Personal life and views ==
Livingston was strongly opposed to fascism and was in correspondence with a number of anti-fascist intellectuals in Italy, like Lauro de Bosis. His political position created difficulties for him at Columbia University.

Arthur Livingston had a notable liaison with the actress Eleonora Duse.

== Published work ==
As a scholar, Livingston was the author of two book-length studies of Gian Francesco Busenello.

He was better known for his superb translations, which are sometimes said to be more readable than the originals. Livingston translated three works by Octave Aubry, nine works of Vicente Blasco Ibáñez, and single works by Benedetto Croce (The Conduct of Life, 1924), Claude Farrère, Guglielmo Ferrero, and Alberto Moravia, as well as The One-Act Plays of Luigi Pirandello (Dutton, 1928). His four-volume translation of Vilfredo Pareto's 1916 magnum opus as The Mind and Society (1935) contributed to a Pareto vogue in the 1930s in American intellectual circles that was promoted by writers like Bernard DeVoto.

A posthumous collection of Livingston's criticism was published in 1950 as Essays on Modern Italian Literature.
