= Bo Gabriel Montgomery =

Swedish political writer

Bo Gabriel de Montgomery (Note: also spelled Bo-Gabriel) (21 April 1894 – 16 October 1969) was a political writer, social commentator and genealogist. He wrote on imperialism, labour relations and social history.

== Biography ==
Born in Stockholm, Sweden, to Carl Oskar Cristoffer Montgomery (1856-1920) and Sigrid Sofia Maria Sandell (1869-1932), de Montgomery was educated at Oxford University where he obtained a doctorate in Philosophy and also studied at the Stockholm University.

He was known for his commentary regarding the Pax Britannica in 1936 when he argued for increased trade and friendly relations between Britain and the United States. He suggested the two nations had a "common interest in preserving the international peace", and was a lead proponent of the Special Relationship, saying "the two Anglo-Saxon nations are of a fundamentally peaceful disposition and prefer to live in peace". He held the view that the British Empire was "the principal factor in the development of humanity... It means that the British Empire is primarily responsible for the maintenance of peace in the world".

In 1926 he invented and patented a unique razor sharpening device, characterised by the automatic rocking of the blade on the strap.

He wrote books on such topics as Economics and Political history. He also researched the genealogy of the Montgomery family, including the origins of their nobility, and based on this work he claimed the title of Comte de Montgomery.

Montgomery died in 1969 in Nyköping, Södermanland, Sweden.

== Works ==
- with Vilfredo Pareto. Politique financière d'aujourd'hui, principalement en considération de la situation financière et économique en Suisse. Attinger Frères, 1919.
- British and continental labour policy: the political labour movement and labour legislation in Great Britain, France, and the Scandinavian countries, 1900-1922. Humphrey Milford, Oxford University Press, 1923.
- Issues of European statesmanship. Routledge. 1926.
- Versailles, a Breach of Agreement, 1932.
- En germansk fredsunion. Hæggström, 1939.
- Origins and History of the Montgomerys: Comtes de Montgomery, Ponthieu, Alençon and La Marche, Earls of Arundel, Chichester, Shrewsbury, Montgomery, Pembroke, Lancaster, Mercia, Eglinton and Mountalexander, Princes de Bellême, Marquis de Montgomery de Lorges. Blackwoods. 1948.
- Upsalakonungarna i europeiskt sammanhang: föredrag i Upsala, 19 March 1953
- Transliteration och tolkning av Newtonstenen, Rökstenen, guldhornen från Gallehus och Asmildstenen. förf. 1965.
- Ancient Migrations and Royal Houses. Mitre Press, 1968
