= Capital services =

In economics, capital services refer to a chain-type index of service flows derived from the stock of physical assets and software. These assets are coordination, equipment, software, structures, land, and inventories. Capital services are estimated as a capital-income weighted average of the growth rates of each asset. Capital services differ from capital stocks because short-lived assets such as equipment and software provide more services per unit of stock than long-lived assets such as land. Unlike capital goods, capital services are owned by the person or group of people providing them.

== Role in productivity measurement ==
Capital services are widely used in growth accounting frameworks to measure the contribution of capital inputs to productivity. The OECD notes that capital services provide a more accurate measure of productive input than capital stock, because they reflect the flow of services generated by different types of assets rather than their replacement value. Short-lived assets such as machinery or software typically have higher service flows per unit of stock than long-lived assets such as structures and land.

== See also ==
- Bureau of Labor Statistics
- Capital goods
- Progressive theory of capital
