= Pareto index =

In economics the Pareto index, named after the Italian economist and sociologist Vilfredo Pareto, is an approximation of income or wealth distribution. It is one of the parameters specifying a Pareto distribution and embodies the Pareto principle. As applied to income, the Pareto principle is sometimes stated in by saying 20% of the population has 80% of the income. Pareto's data on British income taxes in his Cours d'économie politique indicates approximately 20% of the population had about 80% of the income..

One of the simplest characterizations of the Pareto distribution, when used to model the distribution of incomes, says that the proportion of the population whose income exceeds any positive number x > x_{m} is

$$q = \left(\frac{x_\mathrm{m}}{x}\right)^\alpha
= \left(\frac{q}{p}\right)^\alpha$$

where x_{m} is a positive number, the minimum of the support of this probability distribution (the subscript m stands for minimum). The Pareto index is the parameter α. Since a proportion must be between 0 and 1, inclusive, the index α must be positive, but in order for the total income of the whole population to be finite, α must also be greater than 1. The larger the Pareto index, the smaller the proportion of very high-income people.

Given a $p + q = 1$ rule, with $p > q$, the Pareto index is given by:

$$\alpha = \log_{p/q} 1/q = \log(1/q)/\log(p/q) = \log(q)/\log(q/p).$$

If $q = 1/n$, this simplifies to

$$\alpha = \log_{n-1} (n).$$

Alternatively, in terms of odds, X:Y

$$\alpha = \log_{X/Y} ((X+Y)/Y),$$

so X:1 yields

$$\alpha = \log_X (X+1).$$

For example, the 80–20 (4:1) rule corresponds to α = log(5)/log(4) ≈ 1.16, 90–10 (9:1) corresponds to α = log(10)/log(9) ≈ 1.05, and 99–1 corresponds to α = log(100)/log(99) ≈ 1.002, whereas the 70–30 rule corresponds to α = log(0.3)/log(0.3/0.7) ≈ 1.42 and 2:1 (67–33) corresponds to α = log(3)/log(2) ≈ 1.585.

Mathematically, the formula above entails that all incomes are at least the lower bound x_{m}, which is positive. At this income the probability density suddenly jumps up from zero and then starts decreasing, which is clearly unrealistic. Economists therefore sometimes state the Pareto law is only true for the upper 20% of the distribution.

== See also ==
- Gini coefficient
- List of measures of inequality

== References and external links ==
- Vilfredo Pareto, Cours d'économie politique professé à l'université de Lausanne, 3 volumes, 1896–7.
- "Universal Structure of the Personal Income Distribution", Wataru Souma
- "Wealth Condensation in Pareto Macroeconomies", Z. Burda, D. Johnston, J. Jurkiewicz, M. Kamiński, M.A. Nowak, G. Papp, I. Zahed, Physical Review E, volume 65, 2002.
- "Physics of Personal Income", Wataru Souma
- "Pareto Index Estimation Under Moderate Right Censoring", Jan Beirlant, Armelle Guillou, Scandinavian Actuarial Journal, volume 2 (2001), pages 111–125.
- "Wealth Distribution in an Ancient Egyptian Society", A. Y. Abul-Magd, Physical Review E, volume 66, 2002.
- "Pareto Index Induced from the Scale of Companies", Atushi Ishikawa, Physica A, volume 363, pages 367–376, 2006.
- "Power Law Tails in the Italian Personal Income Distribution", Fabio Clementi, Mauro Gallegati, Physica A, volume 350, pages 427–438, 2005.
- Small-World Effects in Wealth Distribution, Wataru Souma, Yoshi Fujiwara, Hideaki Aoyama
- "Weak Limiting Behaviour of a Simple Tail Pareto-Index Estimator", J.N. Bacro and M. Brito, Journal of Statistical Planning and Inference, volume 45, number 1, 1995, pages 7–19.
- A Prediction Error Criterion for Choosing the Lower Quantile in Pareto Index Estimation, by Debbie Dupuis and Maria-Pia Victoria-Feser
- "Generalized Pareto Fit to the Society of Actuaries Large Claims Database", A. Cebrián, M. Denuit and Ph. Lambert, North American Actuarial Journal, volume 8
- "A New Illustration of Pareto's Law", Josiah C. Stamp, Journal of the Royal Statistical Society, volume 77, number 2, pages 200–204, January 1914.
- "The Pareto Law and the Distribution of Income", G. Findlay Shirras, The Economic Journal, volume 45, number 180, pages 663–681, December 1935.
- "Pareto index" in various languages, from the International Statistical Institute's glossary of statistical terms.
- "Second Thoughts on James Burnham", Polemic, G. Orwell, May 1946
