= Circulation of elites =

The circulation of elites is a theory of régime-change described by Italian sociologist Vilfredo Pareto (1848–1923).

According to Pareto, changes of régime, revolutions, and so on occur not when rulers are overthrown from below, but when one elite replaces another. In such transformations, ordinary people function not as initiators or principal actors, but as followers and supporters of one elite or another.

== Assumptions ==
It is a basic axiom for Pareto that people are unequal physically, as well as intellectually and morally. In society as a whole, and in any of its particular strata and groupings, some people are more gifted than others.

The term elite has no moral or honorific connotations in Pareto's usage. It denotes simply "a class of the people who have the highest indices in their branch of activity." Pareto argues that "It will help if we further divide the elite class into two categories: a governing elite, comprising individuals who directly or indirectly play some considerable part in government, and a non-governing elite, comprising the rest." His main discussion focuses on the governing elite.

== Ambiguity ==
There is a basic ambiguity in Pareto's treatment of the notion of the elite. In some passages, it would appear that those occupying elite positions are, by definition, the most qualified. But there are many other passages where Pareto asserts that people are assigned elite positions by virtue of being so labeled. That is, men assigned elite positions may not have the requisite capabilities, while others not so labeled may have them.

It would seem that Pareto believed that only in perfectly open societies, those with perfect social mobility, would elite position correlate fully with superior capacity. Only under such conditions would the governing elite, for example, consist of the people most capable of governing. The actual social fact is that obstacles such as inherited wealth, family connections, and the like prevent the free circulation of individuals through the ranks of society, so that those wearing an elite label and those possessing highest capacity tend to diverge to greater or lesser degrees.

== Social mobility ==
Given the likelihood of divergencies between ascribed elite position and actual achievement and capacity, Pareto is a passionate advocate of maximum social mobility and of careers open to all. He saw the danger that elite positions that were once occupied by men of real talent would, in the course of time, be preempted by men devoid of such talent.

When governing or nongoverning elites attempt to close themselves to the influx of newer and more capable elements from the underlying population, when the circulation of elites is impeded, social equilibrium is upset and the social order will decay. Pareto argued that if the governing elite does not "find ways to assimilate the exceptional individuals who come to the front in the subject classes," an imbalance is created in the body politic and the body social until this condition is rectified, either through a new opening of channels of mobility or through violent overthrow of an old ineffectual governing elite by a new one that is capable of governing.

== Governing elite ==
Pareto introduced a social taxonomy that included six classes, Class I through Class VI. Class I corresponds to the adventurous "foxes" in Machiavelli, and Class II to the conservative "lions," particularly in the governing elite.

Not only are intelligence and aptitudes unequally distributed among the members of society, but the residues as well. Under ordinary circumstances, the "conservative" residues of Class II preponderate in the masses and thus make them submissive. The governing elite, however, if it is to be effective, must consist of a strong mixture of both Class I and Class II elements.

The ideal governing class contains a judicious mixture of lions and foxes, of men capable of decisive and forceful action and of others who are imaginative, innovative, and unscrupulous. When imperfections in the circulation of governing elites prevent the attainment of such judicious mixtures among the governing, regimes either degenerate into hidebound and ossified bureaucracies incapable of renewal and adaptation, or into weak regimes of squabbling lawyers and rhetoricians incapable of decisive and forceful action. When this happens, the governed will succeed in overthrowing their ruler, and new elites will institute a more effective regime.

== Speculators ==
What applies to political regimes applies to the economic realm as well. In this field, "speculators" are akin to the foxes and "rentiers" to the lions. Speculators and rentiers do not only have different interest, but they reflect different temperaments and different residues. Neither is very good at using force, but they both otherwise fall roughly into the same dichotomous classes that explain political fluctuations.

In the speculator group Class I residues predominate, in the rentier group, Class II residues. ... The two groups perform functions of differing utility in society. The [speculator] group is primarily responsible for chang, for economic and social progress. The [rentier] group, instead, is a powerful element in stability and, in many cases, counteracts the dangers attending the adventurous capers of the [speculators]. A society in which the [rentiers] almost exclusively predominate remains stationary and, as it were, crystallized. A society in which [the speculators] predominate lacks stability, lives in a state of shaky equilibrium that may be upset by a slight accident from within or from without.

Like in the governing elite where things work best when both residues of Class I and Class II are represented, so in the economic order maximum effectiveness is attained when both rentiers and speculators are present, each providing a balance by checking the excesses of the other. Pareto implies throughout that a judicious mixture in top elites of men with Class I and Class II residues makes for the most stable economic structure, as well as for the most enduring political structure.

== See also ==
- James Burnham
