= Vilfredo Pareto =

Italian polymath (1848–1923)

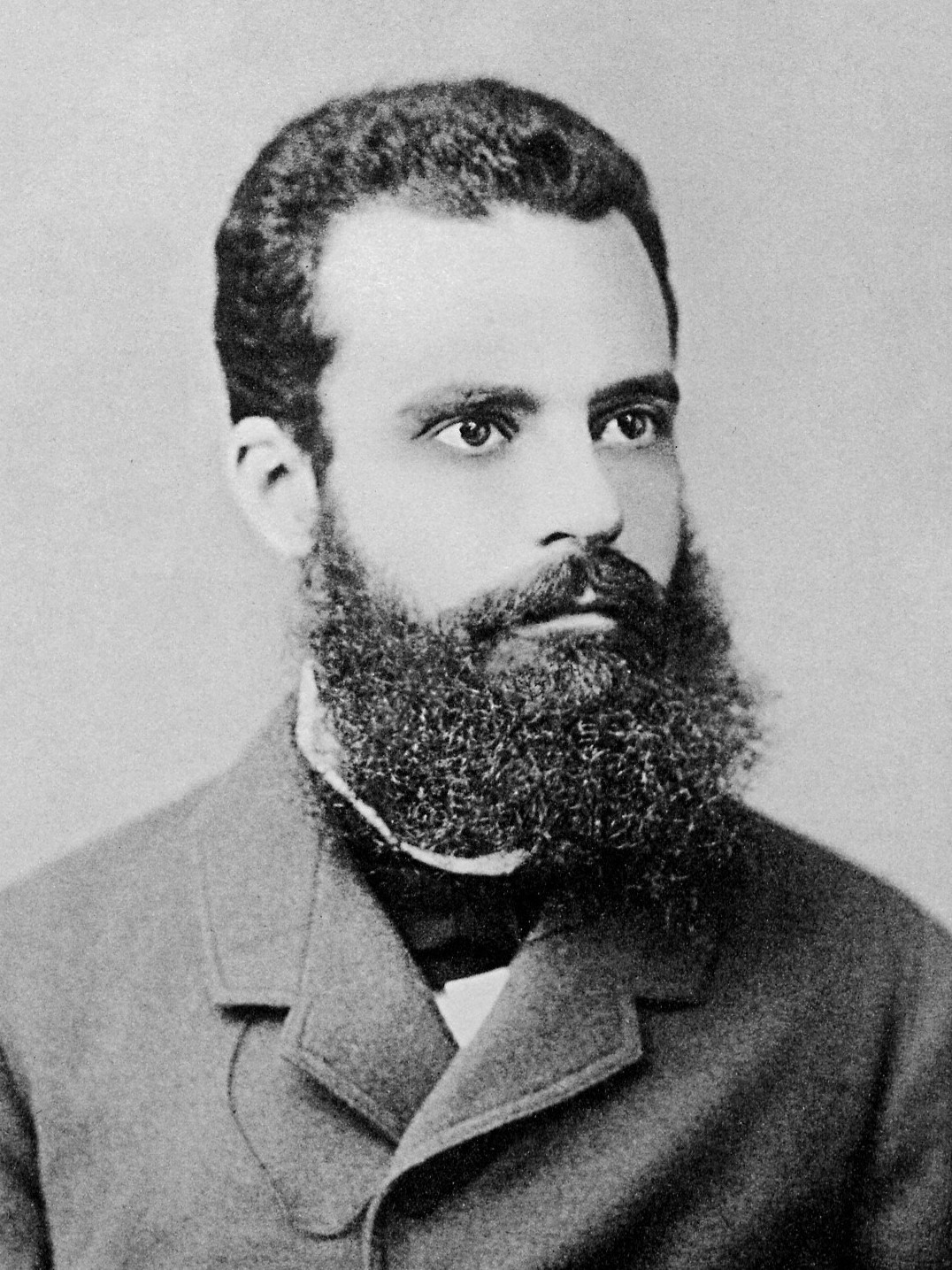
- Pareto in the 1870s
- Born: Wilfried Fritz Pareto; 15 July 1848; Paris, France
- Died: 19 August 1923 (aged 75); Céligny, Switzerland

Academic background
- Education: Polytechnic University of Turin
- Influences: Comte; Machiavelli; Smith; Hume; Burke; Maistre; Molinari; Mosca; Pantaleoni; Sorel; Spencer; Walras

Academic work
- Discipline: Microeconomics; Socioeconomics
- School or tradition: Lausanne School; Italian school of elitism
- Institutions: University of Lausanne
- Notable ideas: Circulation of elites; Ophelimity; Pareto analysis; Pareto chart; Pareto distribution; Pareto efficiency; Pareto index; Pareto interpolation; Pareto priority index; Pareto principle; The Mind and Society

Signature
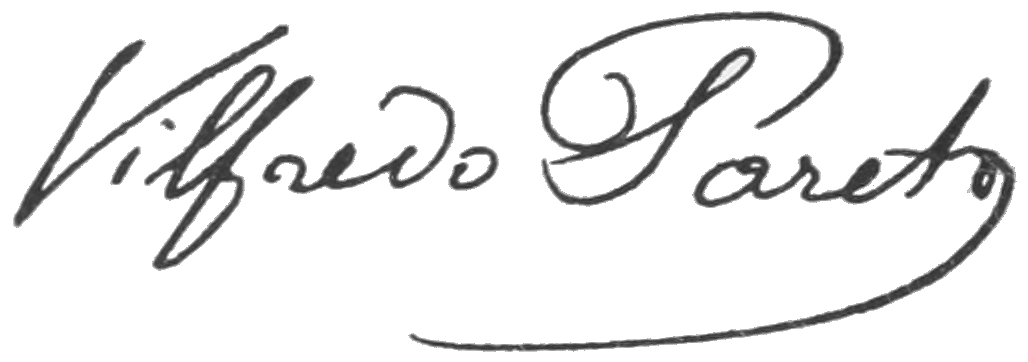

Vilfredo Federico Damaso Pareto (/pəˈreɪtoʊ/; Italian: [paˈreːto]; born Wilfried Fritz Pareto; 15 July 1848 – 19 August 1923) was an Italian polymath, whose areas of interest included sociology, civil engineering, economics, political science, and philosophy. He made several important contributions to economics, particularly in the study of income distribution and in the analysis of individuals' choices, and was one of the minds behind the Lausanne School of economics. He was also responsible for popularising the use of the term elite in social analysis and contributed to elite theory. He has been described as "one of the last Renaissance scholars. Trained in physics and mathematics, he became a polymath whose genius radiated into nearly all other major fields of knowledge."

He introduced the concept of Pareto efficiency and helped develop the field of microeconomics. He was also the first to claim that income follows a Pareto distribution, which is a power law probability distribution. The Pareto principle was named after him, and it was built on his observations that 80% of the wealth in Italy belonged to about 20% of the population. He also contributed to the fields of mathematics and sociology.

== Biography ==
Pareto was born of an exiled noble Genoese family on 15 July 1848 in Paris, the centre of the popular revolutions of that year. His father, Raffaele Pareto (1812–1882), was an Italian civil engineer and Ligurian marquis who had left Italy much as Giuseppe Mazzini and other Italian nationalists had. His mother, Marie Metenier, was a French woman. Enthusiastic about the revolutions of 1848 in the German states, his parents named him Wilfried Fritz, which became Vilfredo Federico upon his family's move back to Italy in 1858.

In his childhood, Pareto lived in a middle-class environment, receiving a high standard of education, attending the newly created Istituto Tecnico Leardi where Ferdinando Pio Rosellini was his mathematics professor. In 1869, he earned a doctorate in engineering from what is now the Polytechnic University of Turin, then known as the Technical School for Engineers, with a dissertation entitled "The Fundamental Principles of Equilibrium in Solid Bodies". His later interest in equilibrium analysis in economics and sociology can be traced back to this dissertation. Pareto was among the contributors to the Rome-based magazine La Ronda between 1919 and 1922 and economics journal Giornale degli Economisti between 1890 and 1905.

=== From civil engineer to classical liberal economist ===
For some years after graduation, Pareto worked as a civil engineer, first for the state-owned Italian Railway Company and later in private industry. He was manager of the Iron Works of San Giovanni Valdarno and later general manager of Italian Iron Works. He did not begin serious work in economics until his mid-forties. He started his career as a fiery advocate of classical liberalism, besetting the most ardent British liberals with his attacks on any form of government intervention in the free market. In 1886, he became a lecturer on economics and management at the University of Florence. His stay in Florence was marked by political activity, much of it fueled by his own frustrations with government regulators. In 1889, after the death of his parents, Pareto changed his lifestyle, quitting his job and marrying a Russian woman, Alessandrina Bakunina.

=== Economics and sociology ===
In 1893, Pareto succeeded Léon Walras to the chair of Political Economy at the University of Lausanne in Switzerland where he remained for the rest of his life. He published there in 1896–1897 a textbook containing the Pareto distribution of how wealth is distributed, which he believed was a constant "through any human society, in any age, or country". In 1906, he made the famous observation that twenty per cent of the population owned eighty per cent of the property in Italy, later generalised by Joseph M. Juran into the Pareto principle, also termed the 80–20 rule. Pareto maintained cordial personal relationships with individual socialists but always thought their economic ideas were severely flawed. He later became suspicious of their motives and denounced socialist leaders as an "aristocracy of brigands" who threatened to despoil the country and criticized the government of the Italian statesman Giovanni Giolitti for not taking a tougher stance against worker strikes. Growing unrest among labour in the Kingdom of Italy led him to the anti-socialist and anti-democratic camp. His attitude towards Italian fascism in his last years is a matter of controversy.

Pareto's relationship with scientific sociology in the age of the foundation is grafted in a paradigmatic way at the moment in which he, starting from the political economy, criticizes positivism as a totalizing and metaphysical system devoid of a rigorous logical-experimental method. In this sense we can read the fate of the Paretian production within a history of the social sciences that continues to show its peculiarity and interest for its contributions in the 21st century. The story of Pareto is also part of the multidisciplinary research of a scientific model that privileges sociology as a critique of cumulative models of knowledge as well as a discipline tending to the affirmation of relational models of science.

=== Personal life ===
In 1889, Pareto married Alessandrina Bakunina, a Russian woman. She left him in 1902 for a young servant. Twenty years later in 1923, he married Jeanne Regis, a French woman, just before his death in Geneva, Switzerland, on 19 August 1923.

== Sociology ==
Pareto's later years were spent in collecting the material for his best-known work, Trattato di sociologia generale (1916) (The Mind and Society, published in 1935). His final work was Compendio di sociologia generale (1920). In his Trattato di Sociologia Generale (1916, rev. French trans. 1917), published in English by Harcourt, Brace, in a four-volume edition edited by Arthur Livingston under the title The Mind and Society (1935), Pareto developed the notion of the circulation of elites, the first social cycle theory in sociology.

Pareto distinguishes social classes into the mass and the elite, the elite itself being divided into a non-governing elite and a governing elite (Treatise on General Sociology, §2034). From the mass, new elites continually emerge, which the existing elite can choose either to fight or to absorb—until it is ultimately defeated and replaced. It is this struggle that, in his view, drives history, which thus becomes “a graveyard of aristocracies.”

Pareto might have turned to sociology for an understanding of why his mathematical economic theories did not always predict actions of individuals in practice, in the belief that unforeseen or uncontrollable social factors intervened. His sociology holds that much social action is nonlogical and that much personal action is designed to give spurious logicality to non-rational actions. We are driven, he taught, by certain "residues" and by "derivations" from these residues. The more important of these have to do with conservatism and risk-taking, and human history is the story of the alternate dominance of these sentiments in the ruling elite, which comes into power strong in conservatism but gradually changes over to the philosophy of the "foxes" or speculators. A catastrophe results, with a return to conservatism; the "lion" mentality follows. This cycle might be broken by the use of force, says Pareto, but the elite becomes weak and humanitarian and shrinks from violence.

Among those who introduced Pareto's sociology to the United States were George C. Homans and Lawrence Joseph Henderson at Harvard, and Paretian ideas gained considerable influence, especially on Harvard sociologist Talcott Parsons, who developed a systems approach to society and economics that argues the status quo is usually functional. The American historian Bernard DeVoto played an important role in introducing Pareto's ideas to these Cambridge intellectuals and other Americans in the 1930s. Wallace Stegner, in his biography of DeVoto, recounts these developments and says this about the often misunderstood distinction between "residues" and "derivations". He wrote: "Basic to Pareto's method is the analysis of society through its non-rational 'residues,' which are persistent and unquestioned social habits, beliefs, and assumptions, and its 'derivations,' which are the explanations, justifications, and rationalizations we make of them. One of the commonest errors of social thinkers is to assume rationality and logic in social attitudes and structures; another is to confuse residues and derivations."

Pareto opposed any policy of wealth redistribution, considering it useless. He thus points out that “if incomes above 4,800 marks were reduced to that level, and the difference distributed to those earning less than 4,800 marks, each of them would receive only about a hundred marks (…) Thus, it can be seen that, even under the best possible assumptions, the benefit for the poor is absolutely insignificant.”

Moreover, he asserts that “the tax [for the benefit] of the poor is a very bad tax, for it burdens the worker in order to help, most often, the idler.” Pareto also believes that “the history of human societies is, to a large extent, the history of the succession of aristocracies.” And it is selection that makes this succession possible; without its intervention, “all races of living beings would fall into decline: the human race does not escape this law. (…) In every race there are born elements of waste that must be eliminated by selection. The suffering caused by this destruction is the price paid for the improvement of the race; it is one of those many cases in which the good of the individual is in opposition to the good of the species.”

Vilfredo Pareto clearly took a stand against the emancipation of women. In his Course in Political Economy, he writes: “Feminism is a disease that can only affect a wealthy people, or the wealthy part of a poor people. With the increase of wealth in ancient Rome came an increase in the depravity of women’s lives. If some modern women did not have the money to indulge their idleness and their lust, gynecologists would be less busy.”

== Fascism and power distribution ==
Renato Cirillo wrote that Pareto had frequently been considered a predecessor of fascism as a result of his support for the movement when it began. Cirillo disagreed with this interpretation, suggesting that Pareto was critical of fascism in his private letters. Pareto argued that democracy was an illusion and that a ruling class always emerged and enriched itself. For him, the key question was how actively the rulers ruled. For this reason, he called for a drastic reduction of the state and welcomed Benito Mussolini's rule as a transition to this minimal state so as to liberate the perceived pure economic forces. Pareto writes to Count Vincenzo Fani Ciotti, himself a fascist sympathizer, that he is particularly drawn to the rejection of democracy proclaimed by fascism.

As a young student, Mussolini had attended some of Pareto's lectures at the University of Lausanne in 1904. It has been argued that Mussolini's move away from socialism towards a form of elitism may be attributed to Pareto's ideas. Franz Borkenau, a biographer, argued that Mussolini followed Pareto's policy ideas during the beginning of his tenure as prime minister. Karl Popper dubbed Pareto the "theoretician of totalitarianism"; according to Cirillo, there is no evidence in Popper's published work that he read Pareto in any detail before repeating what was then a common but dubious judgement in anti-fascist circles.

== Economic concepts ==
=== Pareto theory of maximum economics ===
Pareto turned his interest to economic matters, and he became an advocate of free trade, finding himself in conflict with the Italian government. His writings reflected the ideas of Léon Walras that economics is essentially a mathematical and natural science. He tried to sketch economics in analogy to mechanics, explicitly linking pure (and applied) economics to pure (and applied) mechanics, presenting a concordance table relating the two sciences. Pareto was a leader of the "Lausanne School" and represents the second generation of the Neoclassical Revolution. His "tastes-and-obstacles" approach to general equilibrium theory was resurrected during the great "Paretian Revival" of the 1930s and has influenced theoretical economics since. In his Manual of Political Economy (1906) the focus is on equilibrium in terms of solutions to individual problems of "objectives and constraints". He used the indifference curve of Edgeworth (1881) extensively, for the theory of the consumer and, another great novelty, in his theory of the producer. He gave the first presentation of the trade-off box now known as the "Edgeworth-Bowley" box.

Pareto was the first to realize that cardinal utility could be dispensed with, and economic equilibrium thought of in terms of ordinal utility, that is, it was not necessary to know how much a person valued this or that, only that he preferred X of this to Y of that. Utility was a preference-ordering. With this, Pareto not only inaugurated modern microeconomics but he also attacked the alliance of economics and utilitarian philosophy, which calls for the greatest good for the greatest number; Pareto said good cannot be measured. He replaced it with the notion of Pareto-optimality, the idea that a system is enjoying maximum economic satisfaction when no one can be made better off without making someone else worse off. Pareto optimality is widely used in welfare economics and game theory. A standard theorem is that a perfectly competitive market creates distributions of wealth that are Pareto optimal.

=== Concepts ===
Some economic concepts based on Pareto's work are still in use in the 21st century. The Pareto chart is a special type of histogram, used to view the causes of a problem in order of severity from largest to smallest. It is a statistical tool that graphically demonstrates the Pareto principle or the 80–20 rule. The Pareto principle concerns the distribution of income, while the Pareto distribution is a probability distribution used, among other things, as a mathematical realization of Pareto's law, and Ophelimity is a measure of purely economic satisfaction. The Pareto index is a measure of the inequality of income distribution. Pareto argued that in all countries and times the distribution of income and wealth is highly skewed, with a few holding most of the wealth. He argued that all observed societies follow a regular logarithmic pattern:$\ N=A x^m$ where N is the number of people with wealth higher than x, and A and m are constants. Over the years, Pareto's law proved remarkably close to observed data, with economists typically finding it plausible according to the Encyclopædia Britannica. The Pareto efficiency is generally not very discriminating while the concept of potential Pareto-efficiency, also known as Kaldor-Hicks efficiency, is more discriminating and is widely used in economics. A common criticism outside of economics is that it relies on subjective preferences. According to Oxford Reference, the Pareto principle can be controversial in welfare economics since its assumptions are empirically questionable, may embody value-judgements, and tend to favour the status quo. As a result of its silence on the initial distribution of resources, most sociologists are also critical of Paretian welfare economics.

== Major works ==
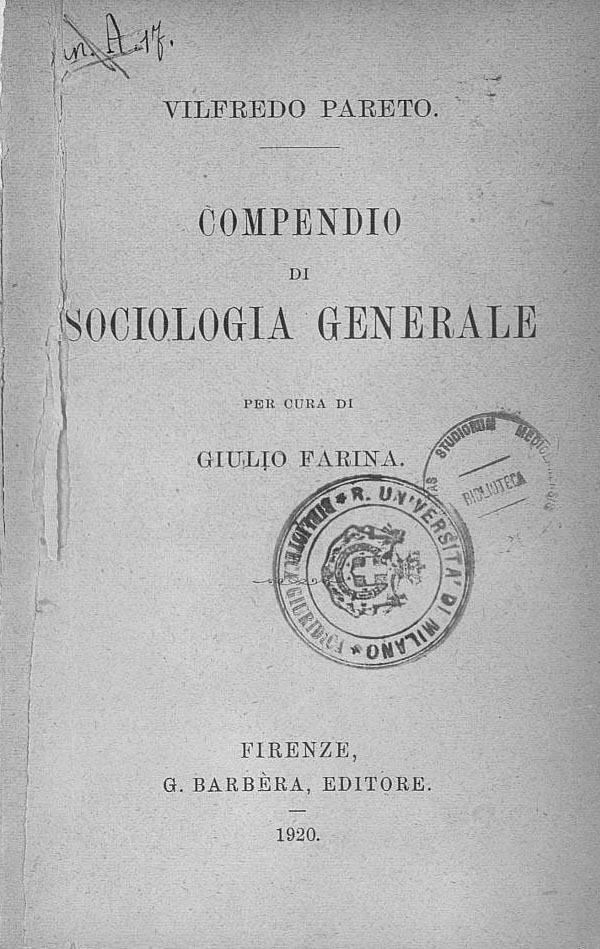
Compendio di sociologia generale, 1920

- Cours d'Économie Politique Professé a l'Université de Lausanne (in French), 1896–97. (Vol. I, Vol. II)
- Les Systèmes Socialistes (in French), 1902. (Vol. I, Vol. II)
- Manuale di economia politica con una introduzione alla scienza sociale (in Italian), 1906.
- Trattato di sociologia generale (in Italian), G. Barbéra, Florence, 1916. (Vol. I, Vol. II)
  - Compendio di sociologia generale (in Italian). Florence: Barbèra. 1920. (Abridgement of Trattato di sociologia generale)
- with Bo Gabriel Montgomery. Politique financière d'aujourd'hui, principalement en considération de la situation financière et économique en Suisse. Attinger Frères, 1919.
- Fatti e teorie (in Italian), 1920. (Collection of previously published articles with an original epilogue)
- Trasformazione della democrazia (in Italian), 1921. (Collection of previously published articles with an original appendix)

=== English translations ===
- The Mind and Society. Translated by Bongiorno, Andrew; Livingston, Arthur. New York: Harcourt, Brace and Company. 1935. (translation of Trattato di sociologia generale). (Vol. I, Vol. II, Vol. III, Vol. IV)
  - Compendium of General Sociology, University of Minnesota Press, 1980 (abridgement of The Mind and Society; translation of Compendio di sociologia generale).
- Sociological Writings, Praeger, 1966 (translations of excerpts from major works).
- Manual of Political Economy, Augustus M. Kelley, 1971 (translation of 1927 French edition of Manuale di economia politica con una introduzione alla scienza sociale).
- The Transformation of Democracy, Transaction Books, 1984 (translation of Trasformazione della democrazia).
- The Rise and Fall of the Elites: An Application of Theoretical Sociology, Transaction Publishers, 1991 (translation of essay Un applicazione di teorie sociologiche).

=== Articles ===
- "The Parliamentary Régime in Italy," Political Science Quarterly, Vol. VIII, Ginn & Company, 1893.
- "The New Theories of Economics," Journal of Political Economy, Vol. 5, No. 4, September 1897.
- "An Italian View," The Living Age, November 1922.

== See also ==
- Robert Michels
- Gaetano Mosca
