= Joshua M. Epstein =

Professor of Epidemiology

- Born: New York City
- Education: MIT
- Known for: Agent-based modeling
- Awards: NIH Director's Pioneer Award (2008)
- Scientific career
- Fields: computer modeling
- Workplaces: Brookings Institution; Johns Hopkins University; New York University

Joshua Morris Epstein is Professor of Epidemiology at the New York University College of Global Public Health. Formerly Professor of Emergency Medicine at Johns Hopkins University, with joint appointments in the departments of Applied Mathematics, Economics, Biostatistics, International Health, and Environmental Health Sciences and the Director of the JHU Center for Advanced Modeling in the Social, Behavioral, and Health Sciences. He is an External Professor at the Santa Fe Institute, a member of the New York Academy of Sciences, and a member of the Institute of Medicine's Committee on Identifying and Prioritizing New Preventive Vaccines.

== Early life and education ==
Epstein was born in New York City and grew up in Amherst, Massachusetts. He received a B.A. at Amherst College in 1976 and earned his Ph.D. in political science from MIT in 1981. His doctoral thesis was entitled Political impediments to military effectiveness: the case of Soviet frontal aviation and his advisor was William W. Kaufmann.

== Career ==
Early in his career, Epstein was Senior Fellow in Economic Studies and Director of the Center on Social and Economic Dynamics at the Brookings Institution. He has worked on agent-based computational modeling of biomedical and social dynamics. He has written or co-authored several books, including Growing Artificial Societies: Social Science from the Bottom Up, with Robert Axtell (MIT Press/Brookings Institution); Nonlinear Dynamics, Mathematical Biology, and Social Science (Addison-Wesley), and Generative Social Science: Studies in Agent-Based Computational Modeling (Princeton University Press). In 2008, he received an NIH Director's Pioneer Award, and in 2010 an Honorary Doctorate of Science from Amherst College.

In Growing Artificial Societies: Social Science From the Bottom Up, Epstein and Axtell developed the first large-scale agent-based computational model, the Sugarscape, to explore the role of social phenomenon such as seasonal migrations, pollution, sexual reproduction, combat, and transmission of disease and even culture.

He has published in the modeling area, including recent articles on the dynamics of civil violence, the demography of the Anasazi (both in the Proceedings of the National Academy of Sciences) and the epidemiology of smallpox (in the American Journal of Epidemiology).

In his book Generative Social Science: Studies in Agent-Based Computational Modeling he explores the role of agent-based models in the generative sciences.

From 1987 to 2010 Epstein was a senior fellow at the Brookings Institution, and served as the director of the Center on Social and Economic Dynamics

He taught computational and mathematical modeling at Princeton University and the Santa Fe Institute Summer School.

He is a member of the New York Academy of Sciences. He is also a member of the editorial boards of the journal Complexity, and of the Princeton University Press Studies in Complexity book series.

== Awards and honors ==
Epstein has received awards including the NIH Director's Pioneer Award (2008).

== Publications ==
- Epstein, Joshua M. (December 1987). Strategy and Force Planning: The Case of the Persian Gulf. Brookings Institution. pp. 210. ISBN 978-0-8157-2453-7.
- Epstein, Joshua M. (May 1990). Conventional Force Reductions: A Dynamic Assessment. Brookings Institution. p. 293. ISBN 978-0-8157-2461-2.
- Epstein, Joshua M.; Axtell, Robert L. (1996). Growing Artificial Societies: Social Science From the Bottom Up. MIT/Brookings Institution. pp. 224. ISBN 978-0-262-55025-3.
- Epstein, Joshua M. (May 5, 1997). Nonlinear Dynamics, Mathematical Biology, and Social Science. Westview. p. 176. ISBN 978-0-201-41988-7.
- Epstein, Joshua M. (January 8, 2007). Generative Social Science: Studies in Agent-Based Computational Modeling. Princeton University. p. 352. ISBN 978-0-691-12547-3.
- Epstein, Joshua M. (2008). Why Model?. Journal of Artificial Societies and Social Simulation.
- Epstein, Joshua M.; Hammond, Ross; Parker, Jon I.; Cummings, Derek (2008). Coupled Contagion Dynamics of Fear and Disease: Mathematical and Computational Explorations. Public Library of Science One Journal.
- Epstein, Joshua M. (2009). "Modelling to contain pandemics". Nature. 460 (7256): 687. Bibcode:2009Natur.460..687E. doi:10.1038/460687a. PMC 3785367. PMID 19661897.
- Lempel, Howard; Hammond, Ross; Epstein, Joshua M. (2009). Economic Cost and Health Care Workforce Effects of School Closures in the U.S. Public Library of Science Currents: Influenza.
- Parker, Jon I.; Epstein, Joshua M. (2011). A global-scale distributed agent-based model of disease transmission. ACM Transactions on Modeling and Computer Simulation.
- Epstein, Joshua M.; Pankajakshan, Ramesh; Hammond, Ross (2011). "Combining Computational Fluid Dynamics and Agent-Based Modeling: A New Approach to Evacuation Planning". PLOS ONE. 6 (5) e20139. Public Library of Science One Journal. Bibcode:2011PLoSO...620139E. doi:10.1371/journal.pone.0020139. PMC 3105018. PMID 21687788.
