= USS Walrus =

USS Walrus has been the name of more than one United States Navy ship, and may refer to:

- USS Walrus (SS-35), renamed USS K-4 (SS-35) before launching, a submarine in commission from 1914 to 1923
- USS Walrus (SS-431), a proposed submarine cancelled in 1944.
- USS Walrus (SS-437), a submarine launched in 1946 but never completed and stricken in 1958
- USS Walrus, a fictional submarine in the 1955 novel Run Silent, Run Deep by Edward L. Beach, Jr.
