= Auguste Walras =

French economist (1801–1866)

Auguste Walras (French: [valʁas]; 1801–1866) was a French school administrator and economist. He was the father of Léon Walras, who was influenced greatly by his father's opinions on economics.

Auguste Walras convinced his son to end his original literary aspirations in favor of economic studies. It was his idea to consider rareté (scarcity) and utility as the source of value. He also encouraged him to use mathematical methods, probably inspired by his former classmate Augustin Cournot.

Auguste Walras found the value of goods by rating their scarcity relative to human wants. His own efforts concerning his theories consisted of a basic idea which Leon Walras was to use. Auguste Walras' opinion on nationalization of land was also adopted by the young Walras.

== Major works ==
- De la nature de la richesse et de l'origine de la valeur (On the nature of riches and the origin of value), 1831.
- "Considérations sur la mesure de la valeur et sur la fonction de métaux precieux" (Considerations on the measure of value and the role of precious metals), 1836, Revue mensuelle d'économie politique
- Theorie de la Richesse Sociale (Theory of social wealth), 1849.
- Esquisse d'une Théorie de la Richesse (Sketch of a theory of wealth), 1863

== Sources ==
- Walras, Léon (1908) Un initiateur en économie politique, A.A. Walras, 1908, La Revue du mois
- Walras, Léon (1965). Correspondence of Léon Walras and related papers. Edited by William Jaffé. Amsterdam: North-Holland.
