= Robert Axtell =

American professor

Robert L. Axtell
- Education: CMU
- Known for: Agent-based modeling
- Scientific career
- Fields: Computer modeling
- Workplaces: George Mason University; Santa Fe Institute; Brookings Institution; Johns Hopkins University; Georgetown University

Robert Axtell is a professor at George Mason University, Krasnow Institute for Advanced Study, where he is departmental chair of the Department of Computational Social Science. He is also a member of the External Faculty of the Santa Fe Institute. Axtell is also the co-director of the new Computational Public Policy Lab at Mason.

== Early life and education ==
Axtell received his first degree at the University of Detroit in 1983 and earned his Ph.D. in Carnegie Mellon University in 1992, where he studied computing, social science, and public policy.

== Career ==
In the early 1990s, whilst still a graduate student, he met Joshua M. Epstein who was to become a key collaborator. This led to Axtell joining Epstein at the Brookings Institution in 1992. The pair developed a keen interest in mathematical modeling influenced by the work of Thomas Schelling, with their primary research interest the modeling of complex social, economic, and biological systems using computational agent based models.

In Growing Artificial Societies: Social Science From the Bottom Up, Epstein and Axtell wrote about the first large scale agent-based computational model, the Sugarscape, developed by Axtell, which they used to explore the role of social phenomenon such as seasonal migrations, pollution, sexual reproduction, combat, and transmission of disease and even culture.

Whilst at Brookings, Axtell also undertook visiting roles at Georgetown University, New School University, Johns Hopkins University and the Santa Fe Institute.

In 2007 Axtell left Brookings for his current post at George Mason University.

Axtell is also a member of the steering committee of the Atalaya Institute, using agent based models to help provide evidence to influence social policy.

In 2013 Axtell became a visiting professor at Oxford's Hertford College during his sabbatical.

== Selected publications ==
Axtell has authored and co-authored several works including:

- Epstein, Joshua M.; Axtell, Robert L. (1996). Growing Artificial Societies: Social Science From the Bottom Up. MIT/Brookings Institution. pp. 224. ISBN 978-0-262-55025-3.
- Axtell, Robert (November 1999). Macal, Charles M.; Sallach, David (eds.). "Why Agents? On the Varied Motivations for Agent Computing in the Social Sciences" (PDF). Proceedings of the Workshop on Agent Simulation: Applications, Models, and Tools. University of Chicago: Argonne National Laboratory: 3–24.
