= Social equilibrium =

In sociology, a system is said to be in social equilibrium when there is a dynamic working balance among its interdependent parts. Each subsystem will adjust to any change in the other subsystems and will continue to do so until an equilibrium is retained. The process of achieving equilibrium will only work if the changes happen slowly. Rapid changes would tend to throw the social system into chaos, unless and until a new equilibrium can be reached.

== See also ==
- Open society
