= Leon Winiarski =

Polish sociologist

Leon Winiarski (1865–1915) was a Polish sociologist. Pupil of Vilfredo Pareto and later Professor of Sociology at the University of Geneva.
