= Barry Dorn =

American physician

Barry C. Dorn (born 1941) is an American physician who is Associate Director of the National Preparedness Leadership Initiative (NPLI), a joint program of Harvard T.H. Chan School of Public Health(HSPH) and the Center for Public Leadership at Harvard's John F. Kennedy School of Government and Associate Director of the Program for Health Care Negotiation and Conflict Resolution at HSPH. He is also an Instructor in Public Health Practice at HSPH and Clinical Professor of Orthopedic Surgery at the Tufts University School of Medicine. Additionally, he served on the Faculty of Health Services at Ben-Gurion University of the Negev, Israel from 2010-2013. Formerly, he practiced at Excel Orthopedic Specialists. He retired from medical practice in 2007. Dorn is among the leaders in the development of the health care negotiation and conflict resolution field.

== Education ==
- Muhlenberg College, Allentown, Pennsylvania (U.S.) (1963)
- Doctor of Medicine from Jefferson Medical College, Philadelphia, Pennsylvania (U.S.) (1967)
- Masters in Public Health Management, Harvard School of Public Health, Boston, Massachusetts (U.S.) (2004)
- Interned at Boston City Hospital, Boston Massachusetts (U.S.) (1967–68)
- General Surgery training at Temple University, Philadelphia, Pennsylvania (U.S.) and University Hospital (now Boston Medical Center), Boston, Massachusetts (U.S.) (1968 –71)
- Orthopedic training at University Hospital, Boston, Massachusetts (U.S.) with affiliations at the Lahey Clinic, the Shriners Hospitals for Children, and the New England Baptist Hospital (1971–74)

== Career ==
Dorn is a member of the original Faculty of the Harvard T.H. Chan School of Public Health Program for Health Care Negotiation and Conflict Resolution. He is a past national Co-Chair of the Health Sector for the Society of Professionals in Dispute Resolution and has also served as Interim President and CEO of Winchester Hospital in Winchester, Massachusetts (U.S.). In addition, he is President and CEO of Health Care Negotiation Associates.

Dorn is a contributing author of the book Renegotiating Health Care: Resolving Conflict to Build Collaboration, the first edition of which was the winner of the Center for Public Resources Institute for Dispute Resolution Annual Book Prize Award and the Book of the Year Award from the Journal of the American Nursing Association. Excerpts of the book were selected by the American Medical Association for serialization in their newspaper. The second edition was released in June, 2011.

Dorn’s work in preparedness dates from the events of September 11, 2001. After receiving a grant from the Centers for Disease Control and Prevention to train in leadership preparedness, the Harvard School of Public Health and Harvard’s Kennedy School of Government expanded the program and began the National Preparedness Leadership Initiative, designed to train government leaders in preparedness. Dr. Dorn has interviewed both domestic and international leaders in an attempt to better understand the thinking behind effective leadership. From this work, conducted in collaboration with Leonard J. Marcus and Joseph Henderson, the idea of Meta-leadership originated and was published in the journal Biosecurity & Bioterrorism. It was further developed through work with Dr. Isaac Ashkenazi and, later, Eric J. McNulty. The Meta-leadership framework and practice method has been adopted by the White House Homeland Security Council as well as many other governmental agencies.

== Selected publications ==
=== Books ===
- Marcus, Leonard. Renegotiating Health Care: Resolving Conflict to Build Collaboration. with Dorn, B., Kritek, P., Miller, V. and Wyatt, J. San Francisco: Jossey-Bass Publishers. September, 1995. Re-issued in paperback with a new preface, 1999. Translated into Polish by the Foundation for Public Health, 2000. A second edition co-authored with Leonard Marcus and Eric McNulty was published in 2011.

=== Articles ===
- Marcus, L.J., Dorn, B.C. & McNulty, E.J. "The Walk in the Woods: A step-by-step method for facilitating interest-based negotiation," in Negotiation Journal, 28(3): 337-349, 2012.
- Marcus, L., Dorn, B., Ashkenazi, I., Henderson, J., & McNulty, E. Crisis preparedness and crisis response: The meta-leadership model and method. In D. Kamien (Ed), The McGraw-Hill Homeland Security Handbook. New York: McGraw-Hill, 2012.
- Marcus, L.J., Ashkenazi, I, Dorn, B., & Henderson, J.. “Meta-leadership: Expanding the Scope and Scale of Public Health.” Leadership in Public Health, 8 (1&2), 2008
- Marcus, Leonard, Dorn, Barry and Henderson, Joseph. “Meta-Leadership and National Emergency Preparedness: A Model to Build Government Connectivity.” Biosecurity & Bioterrorism. 4:2, Summer 2006
- Marcus, Leonard. “A Culture of Conflict: Lessons from Renegotiating Health Care.” Journal of Health Care Law and Policy, 5:2, 2003
- Marcus, Leonard and Dorn, Barry. “Beyond the Malaise of American Medicine.” The Journal of Medical Practice Management, 16:5, March/April 2001
