= Complex organizations =

Complex organizations may refer to:

- organizations that have many people, processes, rules, strategies, and basic units
- organizations as studied by the emerging field of Complexity theory and organizations
- the object of study in Charles Perrow's book Complex Organizations

== See also ==
- Strategic complexity (disambiguation)
