= Leonard Marcus =

Leonard Marcus may refer to:

- Leonard S. Marcus (born 1950), American author
- Leonard J. Marcus (born 1952), American social scientist and administrator
