= SECI =

SECI or Seci may refer to:

- Southeast European Cooperative Initiative
- Solar Energy Corporation of India
- SECI model of knowledge dimensions
- Pio Seci, Fijian rugby league footballer
