= Leonard J. Marcus =

Leonard J. Marcus (born 1952) is an American social scientist and administrator. He is director of the Program for Health Care Negotiation and Conflict Resolution at the Harvard T.H. Chan School of Public Health at Harvard University, and founding co-director of the National Preparedness Leadership Initiative, a joint program of the Harvard T.H. Chan School of Public Health and the Center for Public Leadership at Harvard's Kennedy School of Government.

== Biography ==
Born in Milwaukee, Wisconsin, Marcus obtained his B.A. in social work and Hebrew in 1973 at the University of Wisconsin, where in 1974 he also obtained his M.S.W. in administration and psychotherapy. In 1983 he obtained his Ph.D. in Policy and Organization at the Florence Heller Graduate School for Advanced Studies in Social Welfare of the Brandeis University.

Since 1995 Marcus is director of the Program for Health Care Negotiation and Conflict Resolution at Harvard University, and also serves as lecturer on Public Health Practice. Since 2003 he is also co-director of the National Preparedness Leadership Initiative, a joint program of the Harvard School of Public Health and the John F. Kennedy School of Government. Since 2003 he also is Co-Director of the National Preparedness Leadership Initiative.

He also served on the faculty of Health Sciences at Ben-Gurion University of the Negev, Israel, from 2010 to 2013. He has consulted to, trained, or provided executive coaching to leading health care organizations, including Kaiser-Permanente Health Plan, Beth Israel-Deaconess Medical Center (Boston), and the American Medical Association. In 1992, he co-founded Health Care Negotiation Associates, a national consulting, mediating, and training organization. His has lectured across North America, the Middle East, Eastern Europe, Latin America and the Caribbean.

== Work ==
Marcus' research interests have included implications of conflict in health care services, the uses of mediation for resolving health disputes, and the contributions of conflict resolution to error prevention and patient safety. He collaborated with the Massachusetts Board of Registration in Medicine to develop the Voluntary Mediation Program, the first initiative of its kind to mediate medical practice disputes directly between patients and physicians.

In recent years, Marcus' research, teaching, and consultation have played a key role in national and international terrorism preparedness and emergency response. He is considered a pioneer in the field of health care negotiation and conflict resolution. Marcus has developed a number of practical applications of mediation and conflict resolution.

Marcus has directed numerous projects intended to advance development of the negotiation, collaborative problem solving, and conflict resolution field applied to health related issues. At the Harvard School of Public Health, he has received funding support from, among others, William and Flora Hewlett Foundation, the National Institute for Dispute Resolution, the W.K. Kellogg Foundation, and the Robert Wood Johnson Foundation to develop a curriculum, research agenda, and conceptual and applied framework for the field.

=== Healthcare negotiation and conflict resolution ===
Prior to being recruited by the federal government following 9/11, Marcus' primary work was in health care negotiation and conflict resolution. Marcus is founding Director of the Program for Health Care Negotiation and Conflict Resolution at the Harvard School of Public Health. He was the lead author of the primary text in the field, Renegotiating Health Care: Resolving Conflict to Build Collaboration. The book was selected as co-recipient of the Center for Public Resources Institute for Dispute Resolution 1995 "Book Prize Award for Excellence in Alternative Dispute Resolution". In 1994, he co-authored "Mediating Bioethical Disputes: A Practical Guide". He has written for Newsweek, The Boston Globe, the AMNews as well as a number of scholarly journals. A second edition of the book, co-authored with Barry Dorn and Eric McNulty, was released in June, 2011.

=== Preparedness and emergency response leadership ===
At the National Preparedness Leadership Initiative, an initiative developed in collaboration with leadership of the Centers for Disease Control and Prevention (CDC), the White House Homeland Security Council, the United States Department of Homeland Security, and the Department of Defense, Marcus, along with colleagues Joseph Henderson and Barry Dorn, pioneered development of the conceptual and pragmatic basis for "meta-leadership"- "overarching leadership that strategically links the work of different agencies and levels of government", and "connectivity" – the coordination of "people, organizations, resources, and information to best catch, contain, and control a terrorist or other threat to the public's health and well-being." Their article, "Meta-Leadership and National Emergency Preparedness: A Model to Build Government Connectivity" garnered significant attention. Subsequent development of meta-leadership was undertaken with Isaac Ashkenazi and Eric J. McNulty.

Recent research activities have taken him to the center of leadership dilemmas facing emergency preparedness and response, from direct observation and in-the-moment interviews of central leadership during the 2005 Hurricanes Katrina and Rita on the Gulf Coast to the front lines of the Hezbollah-Israel war in 2006, the 2009 H1N1 influenza pandemic, 2010 Deepwater Horizon oil spill, 2013 Boston Marathon bombings, and 2014 Ebola outbreak. He is leading a five-year CDC project at Harvard and a three-year project with the CDC Foundation to take meta-leadership training to 36 locations throughout the country. At the invitation of the President's Advisor on Homeland Security and Counterterrorism, he has lectured at the White House on meta-leadership to a cross section of senior federal department officials.

== Selected publications ==
- Berkman, Barbara et al. Social Work in Health Care: A Review of the Literature, Chicago: American Hospital Association, 1988.
- Dubler, Nancy Neveloff and Marcus, Leonard. Mediating Bioethical Disputes: A Practical Guide. New York: United Hospital Fund. 1994.
- Marcus, Leonard J., Barry C. Dorn, and Eric J. McNulty. Renegotiating health care: Resolving conflict to build collaboration. John Wiley & Sons, 2011.

Articles, a selection:

- Marcus, Leonard. "On the Bridge between Health Care and Dispute Resolution: Two Common Misconceptions about Change and Managed Care," in: Forum. Conflict Resolution and Managed Care: The Challenge of Achieving Both Equity and Efficiency. Washington, D.C.: National Institute for Dispute Resolution, December 1997, Number 34, 11-15.
- Marcus, Leonard and Dorn, Barry. "Beyond the Malaise of American Medicine," in: The Journal of Medical Practice Management, 16:5, March/April 2001
- Marcus, Leonard. "A Culture of Conflict: Lessons from Renegotiating Health Care," in: Journal of Health Care Law and Policy, 5(2):447-478, 2003
- Marcus, Leonard, Dorn, Barry and Henderson, Joseph. "Meta-Leadership and National Emergency Preparedness: A Model to Build Government Connectivity," in: Biosecurity & Bioterrorism. 4:2, Summer 2006
- Marcus, L.J., Ashkenazi, I, Dorn, B., & Henderson, J. "Meta-leadership: Expanding the Scope and Scale of Public Health." in: Leadership in Public Health, 8 (1&2), 2008
- Marcus, L., Dorn, B., Ashkenazi, I., Henderson, J., & McNulty, E. Crisis preparedness and crisis response: The meta-leadership model and method. In D. Kamien (Ed), The McGraw-Hill Homeland Security Handbook. New York: McGraw-Hill, 2012.
- Marcus, L.J., Dorn, B.C. & McNulty, E.J. "The Walk in the Woods: A step-by-step method for facilitating interest-based negotiation," in Negotiation Journal, 28(3): 337-349, 2012.
