= Max Boisot =

British academic and educator

Max Henri Boisot (11 November 1943 – 7 September 2011) was a British architect and management consultant who was professor of Strategic Management at the ESADE business school in Barcelona. known for his ideas about the information economy, the Information Space, social capital and social learning theory.

== Biography ==
Boisot was born in Maidenhead, Berkshire, England, the son of French army officer Marcel Boisot and Greek actress Hélène Cordet (née Foufounis). He attended Gordonstoun boarding school in Moray, Scotland, and later studied architecture at the University of Cambridge and city planning at the Massachusetts Institute of Technology, before taking his PhD degree in technology transfer at Imperial College London.

After working as a manager for construction firm Trafalgar House, in 1972 Boisot co-founded an architectural partnership, Boisot Waters Cohen, and from 1975 to 1978 acted as a consultant on projects in France and the Middle East. from 1983 to 1989, he was Director and Dean of China Europe Management Institute in Beijing China.

Afterwards Boisot was Professor of Strategic Management at the ESADE business school in Barcelona. Associate Fellow at Templeton College, University of Oxford, and Senior Associate at the Judge Institute of Management Studies at the University of Cambridge. He was also a research fellow at the Sol Snider Center, the Wharton School of the University of Pennsylvania.

His book Knowledge Assets was awarded the Ansoff Prize for the best book on strategy in 2000. The I-Space framework, which is central to his work, is an acknowledged early influence on the development of the Cynefin framework. Boisot was a co-founder of the I-Space Institute, a research and consulting company that grew out of and is based on his work on the strategic management of knowledge.

Max Boisot died from cancer on 7 September 2011, aged 67.

== Selected publications ==
- Information and Organization: The Manager as Anthropologist. London: Collins (1987)
- (Editor) East-West Collaboration: the Challenge of Governance in Post-Socialist Enterprises, London: Routledge (1993)
- Information Space: A Framework for Learning in Organizations Institutions and Cultures, London: Routledge (1995)
- Knowledge Assets: Securing Competitive Advantage in the Information Economy, Oxford: Oxford University Press (1998). ISBN 978-0-19-829607-2
- Explorations in Information Space: Knowledge, Agents and Organization, co-authored with Ian C. MacMillan and Kyeong Seok Han, Oxford: Oxford University Press, (2007). ISBN 978-0-19-925087-5
- Knowledge, Organization, and Management: Building on the Work of Max Boisot, Edited by John Child and Martin Ihrig, Oxford: Oxford University Press, (2013). ISBN 978-0199669165

== EGOS Annual Award in Honour of Max Boisot ==
The EGOS Annual Award in Honour of Max Boisot recognizes an outstanding paper, with preference given to early career scholars. The topic for this award is the knowledge-based study of complex organizations and systems. Contributions in any of the main areas in which Max Boisot forged new understanding through a knowledge perspective are eligible for the award, in particular, research on organizational complexity; the strategic management of knowledge; China's business system; and Big Science.

Scientists who received this award include:

- 2014 Liselore A. Havermans, Deanne N. Den Hartog, and Anne Keegan (University of Amsterdam, the Netherlands) Exploring the Role of Leadership in Enabling Contextual Ambidexterity.
- 2015 Goran Calic, Sebastien Hélie, and Elaine Mosakowski (Purdue University, United States of America) Managing Paradoxes for Creativity: A Psychologically Realistic Simulation of Embracing Organizational Tensions.
- 2016 Tomas Farchi (IAE Business School, Buenos Aires, Argentina), Sue Dopson (University of Oxford, United Kingdom) & George Chondrakis (Universitat Pompeu Fabra, Barcelona, Spain) The Role of Hybrid Governing in Science: Fostering Research across Boundaries.
- 2017 Jochem T. Hummel, Hans Berends & Philipp Tuertscher (VU Amsterdam, the Netherlands) What Do We Have in Common? Collective Action among Heterogeneous Actors in a Meta-organization.
- 2018 Pedro Monteiro (University of Warwick, United Kingdom) Back to the Future? Bureaucracy as an Infrastructure for Collaborative Knowledge Work.
- 2019 Stephanie Schrage (University of Hamburg, Germany) & Andreas Rasche (CBS, Denmark) Inter-organizational Paradox Management: How National Business Systems (NBS) Influence the Spillover of Paradox Management Practices in Global Value Chains
