= I-Space (conceptual framework) =

Framework by Max Boisot for knowledge management

The Information Space or I-Space is a conceptual framework relating the degree of structure of knowledge (i.e. its level of codification and abstraction) to its diffusibility (i.e. how, why, and at what rate it spreads) as that knowledge develops.

== History ==
The model was developed by Max Boisot, and the I-Space framework has been acknowledged as an early influence on the development of the Cynefin framework.

== Use ==
This results in four different types of knowledge.

- Public knowledge, such as textbooks and newspapers, which is codified and diffused.
- Proprietary knowledge, such as patents and official secrets, which is codified but not diffused. Here barriers to diffusion have to be set up.
- Personal knowledge, such as biographical knowledge, which is neither codified nor diffused.
- Common sense – i.e. what ‘everybody knows’, which is not codified but widely diffused.

== Representation ==
The I-Space model is commonly shown as a cube with three axes: abstraction, codification and diffusion. This cube as such spans a three-dimensional "information space". The curve draws a social learning cycle, showing how as knowledge is increasingly moved from concrete experiential Zen type knowledge (insights which can occur suddenly, often equated with a kind of enlightenment) to codified highly abstract (expert language etc.), where it is increasingly easy for it to diffuse independently of the knowledge holder. Once internalised it moves back to the concrete.

== See also ==
- SECI model of knowledge dimensions
