= Complexity theory and organizations =

Application of complexity theory to strategy

Complexity theory and organizations, also called complexity strategy or complex adaptive organizations, is the use of the study of complexity systems in the field of strategic management and organizational studies. It draws from research in the natural sciences that examines uncertainty and non-linearity. Complexity theory emphasizes interactions and the accompanying feedback loops that constantly change systems. While it proposes that systems are unpredictable, they are also constrained by order-generating rules.

Complexity theory has been used in the fields of strategic management and organizational studies. Application areas include understanding how organizations or firms adapt to their environments and how they cope with conditions of uncertainty. Organizations have complex structures in that they are dynamic networks of interactions, and their relationships are not aggregations of the individual static entities. They are adaptive; in that, the individual and collective behavior mutate and self-organize corresponding to a change-initiating micro-event or collection of events.

== Key concepts ==
=== Complex adaptive systems ===
Organizations can be treated as complex adaptive systems (CAS) as they exhibit fundamental CAS principles like self-organization, complexity, emergence, interdependence, space of possibilities, co-evolution, chaos, and self-similarity.

CAS are contrasted with ordered and chaotic systems by the relationship that exists between the system and the agents which act within it. In an ordered system the level of constraint means that all agent behavior is limited to the rules of the system. In a chaotic system, the agents are unconstrained and susceptible to statistical and other analyses. In a CAS, the system and the agents co-evolve; the system lightly constrains agent behavior, but the agents modify the system by their interaction with it. This self-organizing nature is an important characteristic of CAS; and its ability to learn to adapt, differentiate it from other self-organizing systems.

Organizational environments can be viewed as complex adaptive systems where coevolution generally occurs near the edge of chaos, and it should maintain a balance between flexibility and stability to avoid organizational failure. As a response to coping with turbulent environments; businesses bring out flexibility, creativity, agility, and innovation near the edge of chaos; provided the organizational structure has sufficient decentralized, non-hierarchical network structures.

== Implications for organizational management ==
CAS approaches to strategy seek to understand the nature of system constraints and agent interaction and generally takes an evolutionary or naturalistic approach to strategy. Some research integrates computer simulation and organizational studies.

=== Complexity theory and knowledge management ===
Complexity theory also relates to knowledge management (KM) and organizational learning (OL). "Complex systems are, by any other definition, learning organizations." Complexity Theory, KM, and OL are all complementary and co-dependent. “KM and OL each lack a theory of how cognition happens in human social systems – complexity theory offers this missing piece”. Research has linked organizational complexity to corporate inertia; a study of large, diversified U.S. firms found that increased information complexity was associated with lower levels of change in resource allocation and corporate investments across divisions.

=== Complexity theory and project management ===
Complexity theory is also being used to better understand new ways of doing project management, as traditional models have been found lacking to current challenges. This approaches advocates forming a "culture of trust" that "welcomes outsiders, embraces new ideas, and promotes cooperation."

=== Recommendations for managers ===
Complexity Theory implies approaches that focus on flatter, more flexible organizations, rather than top-down, command-and-control styles of management.

== Practical examples ==
A typical example for an organization behaving as CAS is Wikipedia, which is collaborated and managed by a loosely organized management structure that is composed of a complex mix of human–computer interactions. By managing behavior, and not only content, Wikipedia uses simple rules to produce a complex, evolving knowledge base that has largely replaced older sources in popular use.

Other examples include:

- the complex global macroeconomic network within a country or group of countries;
- stock market and complex web of cross-border holding companies;
- manufacturing businesses;
- and any human social group-based endeavor in a particular ideology and social system such as political parties, communities, geopolitical organizations, and terrorist networks of both hierarchical and leaderless nature.

This new macro level state may create difficulty for an observer in explaining and describing the collective behavior in terms of its constituent parts, as a result of the complex dynamic networks of interactions, outlined earlier.

== See also ==
- Complexity theory (disambiguation)
- Cynefin Centre for Organisational Complexity
- The Santa Fe Institute
- Global brain
- Self-organization
- The New England Complex Systems Institute
- Ralph Douglas Stacey
- Complex Adaptive Leadership
