= Strategic complexity =

Strategic complexity may refer to:

- an alternative name for the field of Complexity theory and organizations
- the degree of complexity of elements of a strategy
- the number of elements of a strategic activity system, see Competitive Strategy
