= Deanne N. Den Hartog =

Deanne Den Hartog
- Born: Deanne N. Den Hartog

Academic background
- Education: Vrije Universiteit Amsterdam

Academic work
- Discipline: Organizational behavior
- Sub-discipline: Leadership; human resource management
- Institutions: University of Amsterdam; Erasmus University Rotterdam

Deanne N. Den Hartog is a professor of organizational behavior at the Amsterdam Business School of the University of Amsterdam, where she directs the Amsterdam Business School Research Institute. Her research focuses on leadership, human resource management, employee behavior, trust, and organizational culture.

== Education ==
Den Hartog received an M.Sc. in organizational psychology, cum laude, from the Vrije Universiteit Amsterdam in 1993. She completed a Ph.D. at the university in 1997.

== Career ==
After completing her doctorate, Den Hartog worked as an assistant professor at the Vrije Universiteit Amsterdam. From 2000 to 2005, she was professor of business psychology at the Rotterdam School of Economics at Erasmus University Rotterdam.

Den Hartog joined the Amsterdam Business School at the University of Amsterdam as professor of organizational behavior in 2005. She was appointed director of the Amsterdam Business School Research Institute in 2017.

== Honours ==
Den Hartog was elected a member of the Royal Holland Society of Sciences and Humanities in 2002. She shared the EAWOP/CCL Best Paper Awards with co-authors in 2004 and 2009. She received the Max Boisot Award from the European Group for Organizational Studies in 2014 and the Dutch HRM Network Award in 2017. In 2021, she was elected a member of the Royal Netherlands Academy of Arts and Sciences and received the International Leadership Association's Lifetime Achievement Award. She was named a fellow of the Academy of Management in 2025.
