= Meta-leadership =

Meta-leadership is a leadership framework that supports coordination across organizational lines, facilitating joint action among multiple government agencies. Meta-leadership was "derived through observation and analysis of leaders in crisis circumstances" starting with the September 11 attacks in the United States. The focus on national preparedness has subsequently been distilled for more general application, and it remains in use when multi-organizational responses to disasters are necessary.

== Origins ==
The framework was first developed in 2006 by Leonard J. Marcus and Barry Dorn of the National Preparedness Leadership Initiative (NPLI), a joint program of the Harvard School of Public Health, Harvard's John F. Kennedy School of Government, and Joseph M. Henderson, Chief of Staff at the Centers for Disease Control and Prevention.

The need for more expansive leadership systems was driven by the increased complexity of threats facing the United States. This challenge was illustrated by the response to Hurricane Katrina, which was considered inadequate by many and revealed "profound system weaknesses." It was argued that traditional leadership needed a different approach to coordinate across agencies and governments for emergency preparedness.

== Extensions and evolution ==
Meta-leadership began as a three-dimensional model and practice method. It was further developed and expanded to a five-dimensional model, which was further developed through work that included Isaac Ashkenazi. The five dimensions included the person of the meta-leader, the situation, leading up, leading down, leading across, and leading beyond. The current model was further refined based on lessons learned from events such as the 2013 Boston Marathon bombing response and the 2014–2015 Ebola outbreak response in the United States and the 2014–2015 response to the Ebola outbreak in the United States. The current model retains three core dimensions from the original NPLI model, though they have been expanded and refined.

Earlier variants may still be in use in settings beyond the NPLI at Harvard and in publications. The current model in use at the NPLI builds upon previous versions, but it does not invalidate them.

== Characteristics ==
As a framework and practice method, meta-leadership is described by its authors as drawing upon a wide range of leadership scholarship, including transformational leadership, shared leadership, followership, and complex adaptive leadership.

Meta-leadership emphasizes leadership approaches intended to improve coordination among disparate stakeholders, particularly in government and other organizational settings.

=== Three dimensions ===
1. The person of the meta-leader (self-knowledge, awareness, and regulation): Meta-leaders develop high self-awareness, self-knowledge, and self-regulation. They build the ability to confront fear and lead themselves and others away from emotional responses, toward higher levels of thinking and functioning.
2. The situation (discerning the context for leadership): With often incomplete information, the meta-leader analyzes the situation to determine what is happening, who the stakeholders are, what is likely to happen next, what decisions must be made (and when), and what actions can be taken to respond.
3. Connectivity (fostering positive, productive relationships): The meta-leader charts a course forward, making decisions, implementing those decisions, and communicating effectively to recruit wide engagement and support. The meta-leader navigates four complex facets of connectivity:
  - Leading down the formal chain of command to subordinates (within one's specific operational group), creating a cohesive high-performance team with a unified mission.
  - Leading up to superiors, inspiring confidence and delivering on expectations; enabling and supporting good decisions and priority setting.
  - Leading across to peers and intra-organizational units (other operational groups) to foster collaboration and coordination.
  - Leading beyond by engaging external entities, including affected agencies, the general public, and the media to create unity of purpose and efforts in large-scale response to complex events.

=== In practice ===
Meta-leadership is used in situations requiring collaboration between numerous stakeholders. Meta-leadership is also used as an internal leadership framework for large organizations, as they become less hierarchical and rely more heavily on teams inside and outside the organization. In government emergency preparedness and responses, meta-leadership acts as a framework across different organizations and organizational units, connecting purpose and work to establish a shared course of action in times of critical need for coordinated response.

On a national level, there is a need for effective multi-agency and cross-industry collaboration with private and non-profit organizations in order to achieve large-scale preparedness. Meta-leadership principles provide tools to remove obstacles to collaboration that are often the result of narrow leadership focus on the interests and needs of individual groups of activity. Meta-leaders use system assets, information, and capacities, an important function for organizations with emergency preparedness responsibilities that are constrained by ingrained bureaucratic patterns of behavior. It is the core of the curriculum of the NPLI Executive Education Program for senior government leaders responsible for emergency preparedness and response. It has been widely adopted in public health agencies such as the Centers for Disease Control and Prevention, the United States Department of Homeland Security, the Transportation Security Administration, the United States National Security Council, and many more public and private entities, to best meet the leadership challenges of unexpected or fast-changing situations.

Meta leadership is effective in high-stress scenarios and high stakes situations. Invited by the Federal Emergency Management Agency to look at the government's response to Hurricane Katrina, Dr. L.J. Marcus described the need for meta-leadership in any wide-scale crisis: "Going forward, better communication and coordination among all levels of government, or 'connectivity,' will prove crucial. That means not just harnessing electronic technology to forge links among agencies, but also building relationships between people—transforming a culture that champions independent decision making into one that values cooperation."

Similar observations to Hurricane Katrina emerged during analysis of the response to the Boston Marathon Bombings, a wide-scale, multi-agency, time-constrained effort studied by NPLI faculty. An additional theory of study, swarm intelligence, emerged from the leadership observed during the Boston Marathon Bombing Response. It is now incorporated into the meta-leadership teachings of NPLI.
