= Dave Snowden =

Welsh management consultant and researcher

David J. Snowden
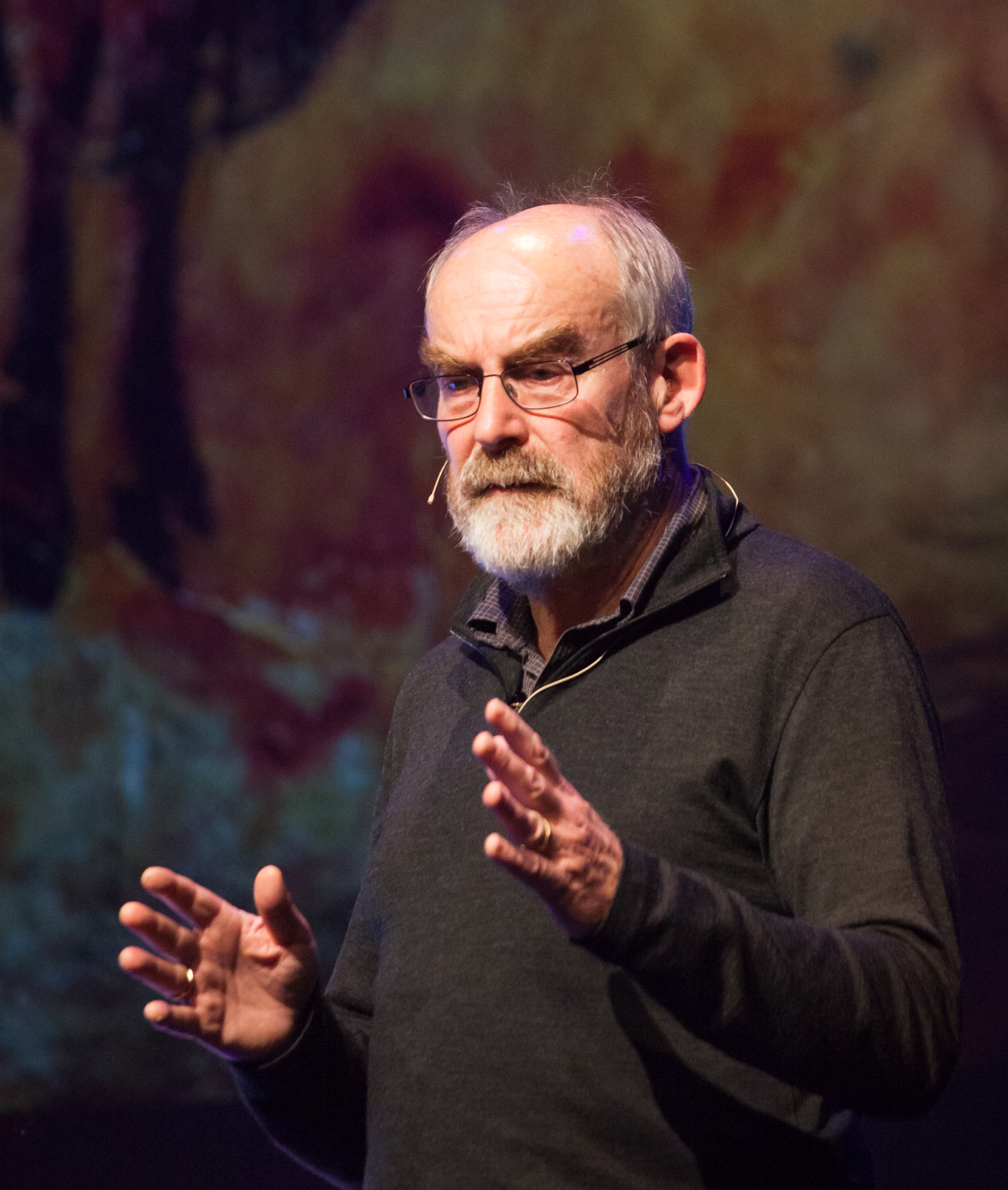
- Dave Snowden, 2016
- Born: David John Snowden; 1954 (age 71–72)
- Education: BA (philosophy), University of Lancaster, 1975; MBA, Middlesex Polytechnic, 1985
- Occupation: Management consultant
- Employer(s): The Cynefin Company, Singapore
- Known for: Cynefin framework
- Website: https://thecynefin.co/

David John Snowden (born 1954) is a Welsh management consultant and researcher in the field of knowledge management and the application of complexity science. Known for the development of the Cynefin framework, Snowden is the founder and chief scientific officer of The Cynefin Company, a Singapore-based management-consulting firm specialising in complexity and sensemaking.

== Education ==
Snowden graduated in 1975 with a Bachelor of Arts (Honours) in philosophy from the University of Lancaster, where he was a member of County College. He obtained an MBA in 1985 from Middlesex Polytechnic.

== Career ==
Snowden worked for Data Sciences Ltd from 1984 until January 1997. The company was acquired by IBM in 1996. The following year Snowden set up IBM Global Services's Knowledge and Differentiation Programme.

While at IBM Snowden researched the importance of storytelling within organisations, particularly in relation to expressing tacit knowledge. In 2000 he became European director of the company's Institute for Knowledge Management, and in 2002 he founded the IBM Cynefin Centre for Organisational Complexity. During this period he led a team that developed the Cynefin framework, a decision-making tool.

Snowden left IBM in 2004 and a year later founded Cognitive Edge Pte Ltd, a management-consulting firm based in Singapore, now trading as The Cynefin Company.

== Works ==
Snowden is the author of several articles and book chapters on the Cynefin framework, the development of narrative as a research method, and the role of complexity in sensemaking. In 2008 he and co-author Mary E. Boone won an "Outstanding Practitioner-Oriented Publication in OB" award from the Academy of Management's Organizational Behavior division for a Harvard Business Review article on Cynefin. In 2008–2009 he wrote a column for KMWorld on trends in technology, "Everything is fragmented". He was an editor-in-chief of the journal Emergence: Complexity and Organization.
