= Explicit knowledge =

Type of knowledge

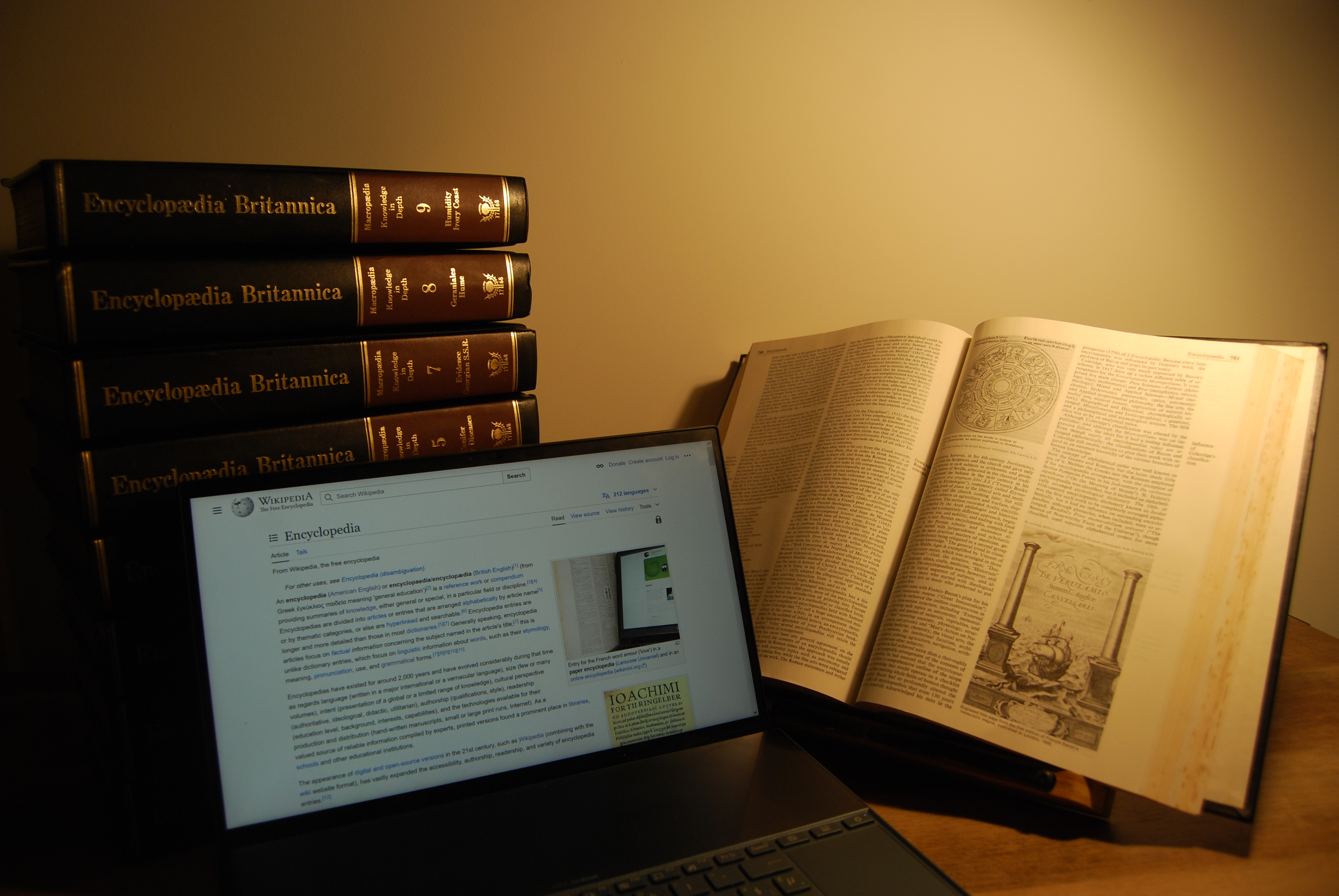
Laptop displaying the Wikipedia article for "Encyclopedia" next to 15th edition of the Encyclopædia Britannica showing the same article.

Explicit knowledge (also expressive knowledge) is knowledge that can be readily articulated, conceptualized, codified, formalized, stored and accessed. It can be expressed in formal and systematic language and shared in the form of data, scientific formulae, specifications, manuals and such like. It is easily codifiable and thus transmittable without loss of integrity once the syntactical rules required for deciphering it are known. Most forms of explicit knowledge can be stored in certain media. Explicit knowledge is often seen as complementary to tacit knowledge.

Explicit knowledge is often seen as easier to formalize compared to tacit knowledge, but both are necessary for knowledge creation. Nonaka and Takeuchi introduced the SECI model as a framework for knowledge creation. The SECI model involves four stages where explicit and tacit knowledge interact with each other in a spiral manner. The four stages are:

- Socialization, from tacit to tacit knowledge
- Externalization, from tacit to explicit knowledge
- Combination, from explicit to explicit knowledge
- Internalization, from explicit to tacit knowledge.

== Examples ==
The information contained in encyclopedias and textbooks are good examples of explicit knowledge, specifically declarative knowledge. The most common forms of explicit knowledge are manuals, documents, procedures, and how-to videos. Knowledge also can be audio-visual. Engineering works and product design can be seen as other forms of explicit knowledge where human skills, motives and knowledge are externalized.

In the scholarly literature, papers presenting an up-to-date "systemization of knowledge" (SoK) on a particular area of research are valuable resources for PhD students.

== See also ==
- Descriptive knowledge
- SECI model of knowledge dimensions
- Tacit knowledge
