= Eric McNulty =

American author

Eric James McNulty is an American author, academic, and public speaker known for work on leadership in crisis and organizational change. He is associate director of the National Preparedness Leadership Initiative (NPLI) at Harvard University and an instructor at the Harvard T.H. Chan School of Public Health.

== Education ==
McNulty obtained a BA in economics from the University of Massachusetts Amherst, and a Master of Arts in leadership from Lesley University.

== Biography ==
=== Research and academic writing ===
McNulty's research concerns leadership during crisis, such as the Boston Marathon bombing response, for which he coauthored work on cooperative leadership through swarm intelligence.

McNulty authored a paper applying learning from neuroscience and psychology to crisis leader development. He was also the lead author on a paper on applying artificial intelligence to tools for developing situational awareness and making decisions in crisis conditions.

McNulty has contributed to the evolution of the Meta-leadership framework, and is co-author of chapters on the topic in the Oxford Research Encyclopedia of Politics, Ciottone's Disaster Medicine (3rd ed.), and The McGraw-Hill Homeland Security Handbook: The Definitive Guide for Law Enforcement, EMT, and all other Security Professionals (2nd ed.).

He has also co-authored a chapter on proximate versus ultimate approaches to leadership in The SAGE Encyclopedia of Leadership Studies (Vol 1-2) and on intuition and crisis leadership in Bursting the Big Data Bubble: The Case for Intuition-based Decision-Making.

=== Books ===
McNulty co-authored the books You're It: Crisis, Change, and How to Lead When it Matters Most and Renegotiating Healthcare: Resolving Conflict to Build Collaboration (2nd ed.). He has written the ebooks Your Critical First 10 Days as a Leader and Three Critical Shifts in Thinking for the Evolving Leader.

=== Other contributions to crisis leadership ===
He is a member of the Future Vision Committee at Disaster Recovery Institute International (DRI) and the editorial advisory committee for Crisis Response Journal.
