= Ralph D. Stacey =

British organizational theorist (1942–2021)

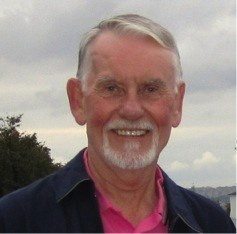
- Professor of Management, Ralph D. Stacey
- Born: October 1948; Johannesburg, South Africa
- Died: 4 September 2021 (aged 72); London, United Kingdom
- Education: University of the Witwatersrand, London School of Economics
- Occupations: Educator, economist, writer
- Known for: Organisations as complex responsive systems

Ralph Douglas Stacey (October 1948 – 4 September 2021) was a British organizational theorist and Professor of Management at Hertfordshire Business School, University of Hertfordshire, and one of the pioneers of enquiring into the implications of the natural sciences of complexity for understanding human organisations and their management. He is best known for his writings on the theory of organisations as complex responsive processes of relating.

== Biography ==
Stacey was born in Johannesburg, South Africa to Jack, an English immigrant, and Auriel, a South African of Scottish descent. His father was a welder in the steel industry and his mother was a housewife. He completed school at Jeppe High School for Boys in 1960 and was awarded an NCR Scholarship to study at the University of the Witwatersrand where he pursued the degree of Bachelor of Commerce specialising in law subjects. He had the intention of going on to study further to become a lawyer but in the course of his studies he developed a greater interest in economics. He won the McBride Scholarship to the London School of Economics which enabled him to travel to London in 1964 and complete a Master of Science degree in 1965. This was followed by a PhD which he completed in 1967; the research topic was the construction and estimation of econometric models intended to predict patterns of industrial development.

In 1968, he returned to South Africa where he taught applied economics at the University of the Witwatersrand for two years after which he moved permanently to the United Kingdom where he lived from 1970 onwards. He took a post in the Commercial Assessment Department of the British Steel Corporation where his main task was forecasting the demand for and prices of a range of steel products. In 1972 he moved to the Corporate Planning Department of the international construction company, John Laing, where he eventually became the manager of the department. He left in 1984 to become an investment analyst at what was to become an investment bank and then in 1985 moved briefly to a management consultancy before taking a position as senior lecturer at Hatfield Polytechnic. This organisation became the University of Hertfordshire in 1992 and in the same year Stacey was appointed Professor of Management.

He published his first book in 1990 which was on his experience of doing strategic planning and this was followed in 1991 by the first of his books, The Chaos Frontier, which sought to explore the implications of the complexity sciences for management and organisations. Then in 1993, he published Strategic Management and Organisational Dynamics, a textbook which located complexity thinking about strategy and organisations in the wider strategy literature. The textbook is now in its 7th edition. The year 1996 saw the publication of his book Complexity and Organisational Creativity. In the meantime he had embarked on the training programme of the Institute of Group Analysis in London, qualifying as a group psychotherapist in 1998 and becoming a member of that Institute and of the Group Analytic Society. He ran clinical therapy groups at a local hospital until about 2004.

Also in 1995 he set up a group supervision of PhD students and it was through this activity that he met Patricia Shaw and Doug Griffin as their PhD supervisor. They became friends and colleagues and together they developed the theory of complex responsive processes of relating as a way of understanding human organisations and their management. The collaboration between the three had a major impact on what Stacey was writing so that there is a radical shift in his way of thinking from a systemic approach prior to 2000 to a responsive processes approach in 2000 and thereafter. Together, in 1995, they set up the Complexity and Management Centre as a research centre at Hertfordshire University with Stacey as its director. Also in 2000, Stacey, Griffin and Shaw established the Doctor of Management programme at Hertfordshire Business School and Stacey took the role of its director until 2011 when he was succeeded by Professor Chris Mowles The programme is still running and has produced 58 graduates from many different countries.

Stacey died in September 2021 shortly before his 73rd birthday.

== Work ==
There are two phases in the work of Stacey but the driving questions remain the same in both of these phases. Having been educated in econometrics and having spent years in the corporate planning functions of commercial enterprises his driving questions had to do with why leaders, policymakers and managers in all organisations are so bad at forecasting the consequences of their actions and why, given the frequently surprising and often unwanted consequences of their actions, they carry on with strategic planning processes. If they do not accomplish what they accomplish through their plans then what is it that they are actually doing to accomplish what they accomplish? These questions made it natural for Stacey to respond to the emerging complexity sciences.

During the first systemic phase of his work he applied first chaos theory and then the models of complex adaptive systems to organisations and management arguing that organisations are complex adaptive systems and that the patterns in the actions of organisations, which are their strategies, emerge unpredictably in self organising processes. Leaders, policymakers and managers are bad at forecasting because it is impossible to predict the consequences of actions, a conclusion supported by the complexity sciences. Management is not the rational, analytical decision-making it is made out to be but a fundamentally political process.

In an attempt to integrate mainstream management theories with the notion of organisations as complex adaptive systems he presented a diagram which expresses a contingency theory of organisations in which the appropriate forms of decision-making and control depend upon the nature of the change situations faced. This diagram became known as the Stacey Matrix and has been frequently adapted by other writers, often in ways not consistent with Stacey's original.

However, in moving to the second, responsive processes phase, of his work he dropped the diagram and now argues against its use because it is easily interpreted in a way that collapses the paradox of certainty and uncertainty and so sustains the dominant discourse on management while using an alternative jargon of complexity.

The second phase of Stacey's work reflects collaboration with Doug Griffin and Patricia Shaw. This phase drops the application of complex adaptive systems to organisations, arguing that it is invalid to simply apply the natural sciences to human action. Instead, the complexity sciences are regarded as a source domain for analogies and when these analogies are transferred to the domain of human action they need to be interpreted in a manner that takes full account of the attributes of human agents, namely, that they are conscious, self-conscious, emotional, often spontaneous, often thoughtful and reflective beings who have some degree of choice over what they do.

Human agents are basically interdependent, they respond to each other and their choices and intentions play into each other producing unpredictable, emergent patterns over time. To signal the move from the domain of the natural sciences to the domain of human action, Stacey and colleagues refer to these processes as complex responsive processes of relating. These responsive processes take the form of:

- communication understood, drawing on George Herbert Mead, as conversation;
- patterns of power relations which take the form, drawing on Norbert Elias, of the dynamics of inclusion-exclusion and identity;
- ideology as a combination of values and norms, drawing on the work of Hans Joas, William James and John Dewey; and
- evaluative choices.

It is in these local responsive processes that there emerge population-wide patterns of activity, culture and habitus. Organisational life is thought of as the game people are invested in and organising processes are understood to be the ordinary politics of everyday life.

== Publications ==
- Dynamic Strategic Management for the 1990s. Kogan Page, London 1990.
- The Chaos Frontier: Creative Strategic Control for Business. Butterworth Heinemann, Oxford 1991.
- Managing Chaos. Kogan Page, London 1992.
- Managing the Unknowable: The Strategic Boundaries Between Order and Chaos. Jossey Bass, San Francisco 1992.
- Strategic Management and Organisational Dynamics. Pitman, London 1993.
- Complexity and Creativity in Organisations. Berret-Koehler, San Francisco 1996.
- Strategic Management and Organisational Dynamics: the challenge of complexity (3rd edition). Pitman (2nd edition, 1996), London 2000.
- Complex Responsive processes in organizations: learning and knowledge creation. Routledge, London 2001.
- Complexity and Group Processes: A radically social understanding of individuals. Brunner-Routledge, London 2003.
- Complexity and Organizational Reality: Uncertainty and the need to rethink management after the collapse of investment capitalism. Routledge, London 2010. ISBN 0-415-55647-3.
- Strategic Management and Organisational Dynamics: the challenge of complexity to ways of thinking about organisations. Pearson Education (6th edition), London 2011, ISBN 978-0-273-70811-7.
- The Tools and Techniques of Leadership and Management: Meeting the challenge of complexity. Routledge, London 2012. ISBN 978-0-415-53118-4.
- together with Parker, D. Chaos, Management and Economics: The Implications of Nonlinear Thinking. Hobart Papers 125, Institute of Economic Affairs, London 1994.
- together with Griffin, D. and Shaw, P. Complexity and Management: fad or radical challenge to systems thinking. Routledge, London 2000.
