= Isaac Ashkenazi =

Israeli disaster management expert

- יצחק אשכנזי
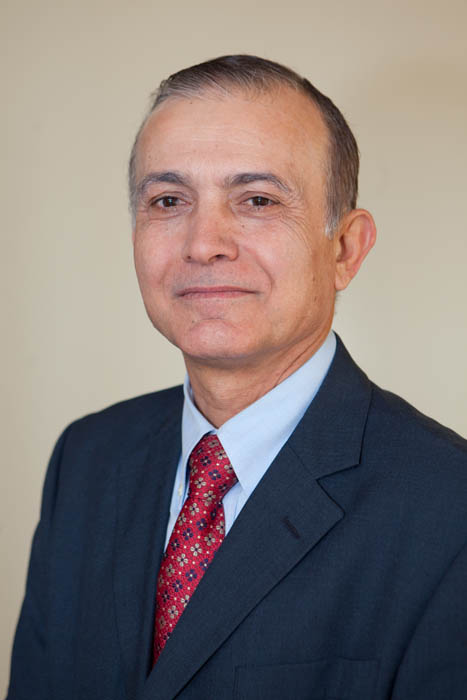
- Born: 1957 (age 68–69); Israel
- Occupations: Professor of disaster medicine, consultant

Academic background
- Education: Hebrew University of Jerusalem, Tel-Aviv University, John F. Kennedy School of Government, University of Haifa

Academic work
- Institutions: Ben-Gurion University of the Negev, Harvard University
- Notable works: Meta-leadership, disaster medicine

Isaac Ashkenazi (born April 2, 1957) is an Israeli physician, life saver, disaster management specialist, ophthalmic surgeon, professor at Ben-Gurion University of the Negev, and a colonel (res.) in the HFC of the Israel Defense Forces (IDF). Ashkenazi is considered a world expert in disaster management, emergency preparedness, crisis leadership, and humanitarian response.

== Biography ==
Ashkenazi earned his medical degree (MD) from the Hebrew University in Jerusalem in 1982, graduating with highest distinction. He has researched questions such as the influence of a continuous 110 km march with a 20 kg backpack load on renal function and other laboratory parameters in healthy young soldiers.

Ashkenazi completed his specialization in ophthalmology at Sheba Medical Center between 1987-1991 and received a Master of Science (MSc) in Ophthalmology from Tel Aviv University with highest distinction.

Ashkenazi later earned a Master of Public Administration (MPA) from the Kennedy School of Government at Harvard University (2000–2001) and a degree from the National Security College (Israel) of Haifa University (2005–2006).

Ashkenazi has received presidential medals of honor for humanitarian assistance from several countries, including Turkey, Greece, and Rwanda.

== Military career ==
Ashkenazi served in the IDF in various senior medical positions:

- Military doctor in the Paratroopers and Commando Forces
- Head of Medical Services in the West Bank (1993–1994)
- Head of IDF Public Health Department, as a lieutenant colonel
- Surgeon General of the Home Front Command

== Academic career ==
Ashkenazi has served as a professor at the Faculty of Health Sciences at Ben-Gurion University of the Negev since 2008. He is also the founder and chair of NIRED (National Institute for Regulation of Emergency and Disaster) at the College of Law and Business in Ramat Gan. He has held visiting academic roles, including:

- Director of the Urban Terrorism Preparedness Program at Harvard University
- Faculty member of the National Preparedness Leadership Initiative (NPLI) at Harvard University
- Adjunct Professor of Epidemiology at Emory University

Ashkenazi has published over 200 scientific articles on disaster management, medical preparedness for emergencies, response to terrorist attacks, and crisis leadership.

== Scientific contributions and theories ==
=== The "Immediate Responders" concept ===
Ashkenazi was first to identify and define the crucial role of bystanders ("Immediate Responders") in saving lives during disaster events. This concept distinguishes between "Immediate Responders" - ordinary citizens present at the scene, and "First Responders" - official emergency personnel who arrive later.

== Humanitarian missions ==
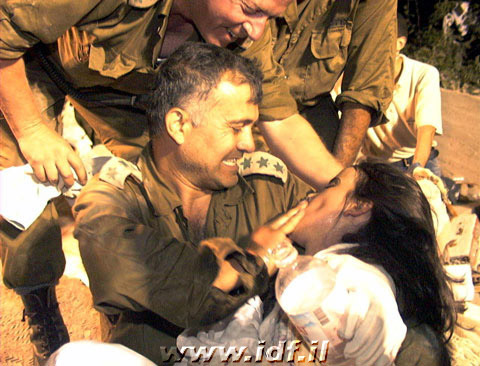
Ashkenazi in rescue efforts in 1999 in Izmit, Turkey

Ashkenazi has been involved with humanitarian aid missions:

- Israeli Medical Delegation assisting after the bombing of the US Embassy in Nairobi (1998).
- Israeli Medical Delegation assisting earthquake victims in Turkey (1999).
- Israeli Medical Delegation assisting earthquake victims in Greece (1999).
- Partnered medical teams in response to the 2004 Indian Ocean tsunami in Thailand.
- Lead scientific team to investigate the public response during 2008 Sichuan earthquake.
- Participated in the rescue operations of Ethiopian Jews

== Consulting work ==
Ashkenazi serves as a senior consultant in disaster management and emergency preparedness to multiple governments and agencies worldwide:

- Consultant to American federal entities including the Centers for Disease Control and Prevention (CDC), Department of Homeland Security, Department of Health & Human Services, White House and the World Bank.
- Consultant to the Chinese Ministry of Health.

== Selected publications ==
- Ashkenazi, I. (2011). "Preparedness and Response to a Mass Casualty Event Resulting from Terrorist Use of Explosives." Centers for Disease Control and Prevention.
- Marcus, L.J., Ashkenazi, I., Dorn, B., & Henderson, J. (2008). "Meta-leadership: Expanding the scope and scale of public health." Leadership in Public Health, 8(1&2).
- Ashkenazi, I., McNulty, E., Marcus, L., Dorn, B.C. (2012). "The Role of Bystanders in Mass Casualty Events: Lessons from the 2010 Haiti Earthquake." Journal of Defense Studies & Resource Management.
- Ashkenazi, I., Hunt, R. (2019). "You're It—You've Got to Save Someone: Immediate Responders, Not Bystanders." Frontiers in Public Health, 7.
- Rapaport, C., Ashkenazi, I. (2021). "Why Does Israel Lead the World in COVID-19 Vaccinations? Applying Mass Casualty Event Principles to COVID-19 Vaccination Programs." International Journal of Environmental Research and Public Health, 18(10), 5362.

== See also ==
- Disaster management
- Crisis management
- Emergency medicine
- Mass casualty incident
