= SECI model of knowledge dimensions =

Model of knowledge creation

The SECI model of knowledge dimensions (or the Nonaka-Takeuchi model) is a model of knowledge creation that explains how tacit and explicit knowledge are converted into organizational knowledge. The aim is to change the explicit knowledge of the model back into the tacit knowledge of the employees. In this case, employees' tacit knowledge can be kept in the organization. When employees express their thoughts and ideas openly and share their best working practices, it can lead to new innovations and help to make operations more efficient.

The SECI model distinguishes four knowledge dimensions (forming the "SECI" acronym): Socialization, Externalization, Combination, and Internalization. The model was originally developed by Ikujiro Nonaka in 1990 and later further refined by Hirotaka Takeuchi.

== Four modes of knowledge conversion ==
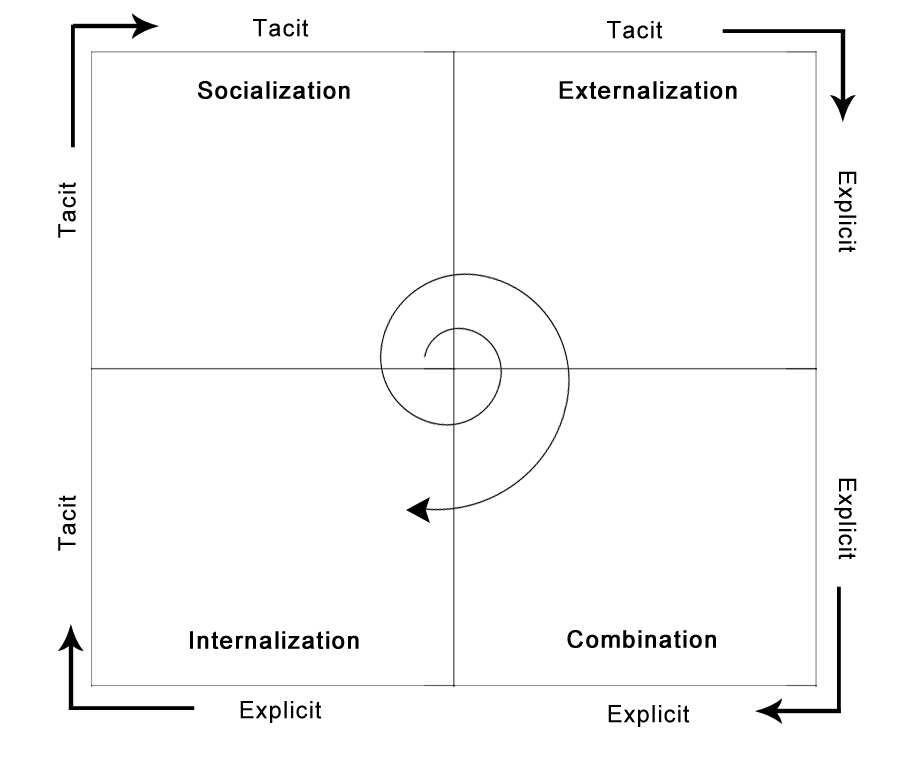
SECI model of knowledge dimensions

Assuming that knowledge is created through the interaction between tacit and explicit knowledge, four different modes of knowledge conversion can be postulated: from tacit knowledge to tacit knowledge (socialization), from tacit knowledge to explicit knowledge (externalization), from explicit knowledge to explicit knowledge (combination), and from explicit knowledge to tacit knowledge (internalization).

Four modes of knowledge conversion:

1. Socialization (Tacit to Tacit) – Socialization is a process of sharing knowledge, including observation, imitation, and practice through apprenticeship. Apprentices work with their teachers or mentors to gain knowledge by imitation, observation, and practice. In effect, socialization is about capturing knowledge by physical proximity, wherein direct interaction is a supported method to acquire knowledge. Socialization comes from sharing the experience with others. It also can come from direct interactions with customers and from inside your own organization, just by interacting with another section or working group. For example, brainstorming with colleagues. The tacit knowledge is transferred by common activity in the organizations, such as being together and living in the same environment.
2. Externalization (Tacit to Explicit) – Externalization is the process of making tacit knowledge explicit, wherein knowledge is crystallized and is thus able to be shared by others, becoming the basis of new knowledge. At this point, personal tacit knowledge becomes useful to others as well, because it is expressed in a form that can be interpreted and understood. Concepts, images, and written documents, for example, can support this kind of interaction.
3. Combination (Explicit to Explicit) – Combination involves organizing and integrating knowledge, whereby different types of explicit knowledge are merged (for example, in building prototypes). The creative use of computerized communication networks and large-scale databases can support this mode of knowledge conversion: explicit knowledge is collected from inside or outside the organization and then combined, edited, or processed to form new knowledge. The new explicit knowledge is then disseminated among the members of the organization.
4. Internalization (Explicit to Tacit) – Internalization involves the receiving and application of knowledge by an individual, enclosed by learning-by-doing. On the other hand, explicit knowledge becomes part of an individual's knowledge and will be assets for an organization. Internalization is also a process of continuous individual and collective reflection, as well as the ability to see connections and recognize patterns, and the capacity to make sense between fields, ideas, and concepts.

These four modes of knowledge conversion form a spiral of knowledge creation. Since knowledge creation can be seen as a continual process, the spiral evolves continuously through these four modes of knowledge conversion. Moreover, with the four modes of knowledge conversion, the interaction that takes place between tacit and explicit knowledge is strengthened in a spiral.

Nonaka and Konno subsequently developed the SECI model by introducing the Japanese concept of 'Ba', which roughly translates as 'place'. Ba can be thought of as a shared context or shared space in which knowledge is shared, created, and utilized. It is a concept that unifies physical space such as an office space, virtual space such as e-mail, and mental space such as shared ideas.

== Acceptance ==
Nonaka’s and Takeuchi’s SECI model is widely known and has achieved paradigmatic status. Perceived advantages of the model include:

- its appreciation of the dynamic nature of knowledge and knowledge creation.
- it provides a framework for the management of the relevant processes.

The model has also been much criticized at times. Criticisms include:

- It is based on a study of Japanese organizations, which heavily rely on tacit knowledge: employees are often with a company for life.
- The linearity of the concept: can the spiral jump steps? Can it go counter-clockwise? Since the model is bi-directional with only two nodes, the answer is yes, but so what? An example would be an elevator in a two-story building. While it may have numbers for the floor to push to go to, it could just as easily function with only a "go" button.
- Stephen Gourlay (2006) has considered why knowledge conversion has to begin with socialization if tacit knowledge is the source of new knowledge. Knowledge conversion could also begin for example with combination because new knowledge creation would begin with the creative synthesis of explicit knowledge.
- The model does not explain at all how new ideas and solutions are developed in practice.

== See also ==
- Four stages of competence
- I-Space (conceptual framework)
- Tacit knowledge
- Explicit knowledge
- Organizational learning
