= Complex adaptive leadership =

Approach to leadership

Complex adaptive leadership (CAL) is an approach to leadership based on a polyarchic assumption (leadership of the many by the many), rather than based on an oligarchic assumption (leadership of the many by the few). Leadership in this theory is seen as a complex dynamic involving all, rather than only a role or attribute within a hierarchy. The theory calls for skills, attributes and roles which are additional to the demands of traditional leadership. The term appeared in various articles and chapters of books between 2002 and 2010, mainly in articles concerning the medical field (see articles by: Tatsuo I 2002, Hill et al. 2008, Hanah et al. 2008, Avolio et al. (2008), Ford 2009, and Chadwick 2010).

In 2010 Obolensky published 'Complex Adaptive Leadership - Embracing Paradox and Uncertainty' , building on his prior work under the auspices of the Centre for Leadership Studies at The University of Exeter. For Obolensky a key output of complex adaptive leadership is self-organisation, and the ability for organisations to operate with reduced hierarchy, less management effort, and bureaucracy, and resultant higher staff engagement with lower costs. He traces the roots of his work to his time in the military during the 1980s, his teaching in the 1990s and his reading Gleick's book on Chaos. Subsequently he also took into account the writings of Lau Tzu's Tao Te Ching, situational leadership, servant leadership, the emergent strategy and shared leadership approach of Mintzberg, the adaptive leadership of Heifitz and others as well Spillane's work on distributed leadership.
