= Burkard Hillebrands =

German physicist (born 1957)

- Born: 1957 (age 68–69); Hattingen, Germany
- Known for: Spintronics, magnonics Magnetization dynamics Solid-state physics Materials science
- Awards: Fellow Institute of Physics (2004); APS Fellow (2010); IEEE Fellow (2010); Member Academy of Sciences and Literature, Mainz (2010); ERC Advanced Grant (2016) Member National Academy of Science and Engineering (acatech) (2018)
- Scientific career
- Fields: Physics, magnetism
- Workplaces: University of Cologne; University of Arizona; RWTH Aachen University; University of Karlsruhe; University of Kaiserslautern; Leibniz Institute for Solid State and Materials Research Dresden (IFW)

Burkard Hillebrands (born 1957) is a German physicist and professor of physics. He is the leader of the magnetism research group in the Department of Physics at the Technische Universität Kaiserslautern.

== Academic career ==
Burkard Hillebrands was born in 1957. He studied physics at the University of Cologne (1977–1982) and was awarded his PhD in 1986 at the University of Cologne under the supervision of Gernot Güntherodt.

After a postdoctoral stay at the Optical Sciences Center in Tucson, Arizona he received his habilitation from the RWTH Aachen in 1993. He was employed as an associate professor at the University of Karlsruhe in 1994. In 1995 he accepted a full professor position at the Technische Universität Kaiserslautern. Between 2006 and 2014, he served as the Vice President for Research, Technology and Innovation of the Technische Universität Kaiserslautern. He is a member of the Academy of Science and Literature Mainz, and from 2017 to 2026 he has been its vice president and chair of the Commission for Mathematics and Physical Sciences. Since 2018 he is member of the National Academy of Science and Engineering (acatech). Hillebrands was the Scientific Director and Chairman of the Executive Board of the Leibniz Institute for Solid State and Materials Research (IFW), Dresden for the period from July 2016 to March 2018.

He serves or has served as either chairperson or vice-chairperson in various coordinated initiatives of the German Science Foundation and the European Community, such as the German priority programme “Ultrafast Magnetization Processes” (2002–2008, coordinator), the EU research training networks "Ultrafast Magnetization Processes in Advanced Devices (ULTRASWITCH)” (2002–2006), „Spin Current Induced Ultrafast Switching (SPINSWITCH)” (2004–2010, coordinator)“, the Japanese-German research unit “ASPIMATT: Advanced Spintronic Materials and Transport Phenomena” (2010–2015, vice-coordinator), and the transregional collaborative research center “Condensed Matter Systems with Variable Many-Body Interactions (SFB/TRR 49)” (2007–2019, vice-coordinator). From 2016, he also serves as vice-coordinator of the transregional collaborative research center SFB/TRR 173 named “Spin in its collective environment (Spin+X) of the German Research Foundation (Deutsche Forschungsgemeinschaft, DFG). He is a member of the State Research Center for Optics and Material Sciences (OPTIMAS) at TU Kaiserslautern. From 2015 to 2017, he was secretary of the C.9 Commission of the International Union of Pure and Applied Physics (IUPAP), and from 2018 to 2021 he was the C.9 Commission Chair. He is founding member of the European Magnetism Association since 2016 and was its president for the term 2019-2022.

== Awards and honours ==
- 2004: Fellow of Institute of Physics (Great Britain)
- 2005: IEEE Magnetics Society Distinguished Lecturer Award
- 2010: Fellow of the American Physical Society
- 2010: Fellow of the Institute of Electrical and Electronics Engineers
- 2010: Member of Academy of Science and Literature, Mainz
- 2016: ERC Advanced Grant
- 2018: Member National Academy of Science and Engineering (acatech)
- 2022: Member of the European Academy of Sciences (EURASC)
- 2023: Achievement Award of the IEEE Magnetics Society
- 2026: Dominique Givord Award of the European Magnetism Association (EMA)
- 2026: Blaise Pascal Medal in Physics of the European Academy of Sciences (EurASc)

== Research ==
Hillebrands' research field is mostly in spintronics. His special interests are in spin dynamics and magnonics, material properties of thin magnetic films, heterostructures as well as multilayers nanostructures. In the field of spin dynamics and magnonics he is particularly interested in the properties of spin waves and their quanta, magnons, and their application to future information technologies. He is also interested in research on dynamic magnetic excitations in confined magnetic structures, linear and nonlinear spin wave propagation phenomena, magnon gases and condensates, magnon supercurrents, magnonic crystals and magnetic storage. A further focus of interest lies on spin transport phenomena, in particular on conversion processes between magnon, spin and charge currents (spin Hall effects, spin Seebeck effects). His particular technical interest lies in the development of space-, time- and phase resolved Brillouin light scattering spectroscopy and time resolved Kerr effect techniques.

== Publications ==
Hillebrands has published more than 425 articles in peer-reviewed international scientific journals, five patents and patent applications, seven book contributions, and he is co-editor of the Springer TAP book series on Spin Dynamics in Confined Magnetic Structures.
