= University of Koblenz =

Public university in Koblenz, Germany

- Universität Koblenz
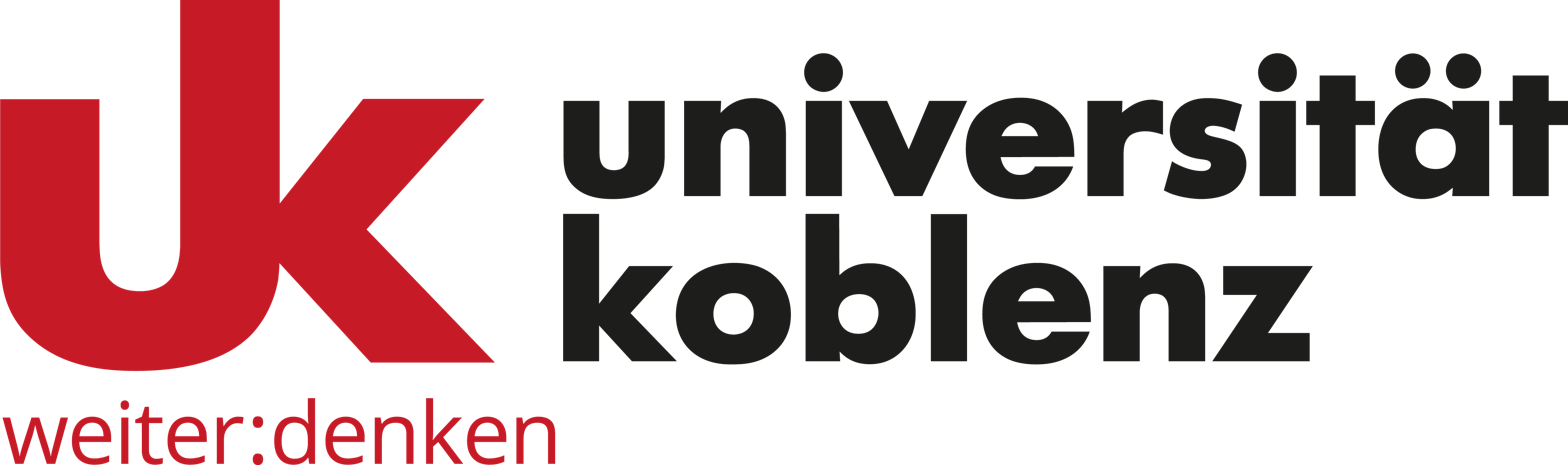
- Type: Public
- Established: January 1, 2023
- Chancellor: Michael Ludwig
- President: Prof. Dr. Stephen Wehner
- Location: Koblenz, Rhineland-Palatinate, Germany; 50°21′49″N 7°33′30″E
- Website: www.uni-koblenz.de/de

The University of Koblenz (German Universität Koblenz) is a university in Koblenz. The university was created on January 1, 2023, through the restructuring of the Rhineland-Palatinate universities by the state authority; the former University of Koblenz-Landau had two campuses in Koblenz and Landau 160 km apart, its Landau campus joined with the Technical University of Kaiserslautern to form the University of Kaiserslautern-Landau, while the Koblenz campus became the University of Koblenz.

== Organisation ==
The four departments of the university are

- Educational sciences
- Philology and Cultural Studies
- Mathematics / Science
- Computer science
