= Gereon Niedner-Schatteburg =

German physicist and chemist (born 1959)

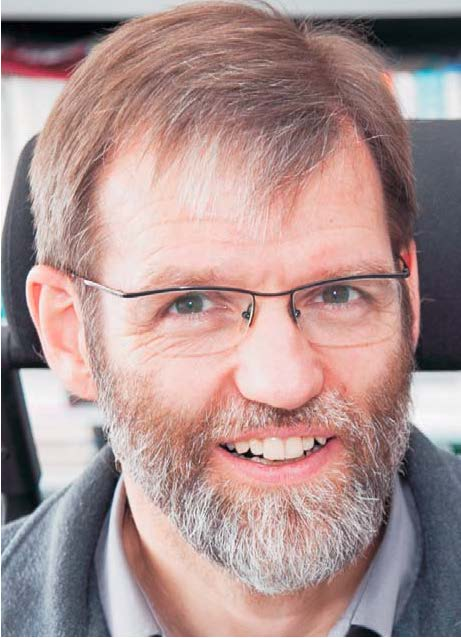
Gereon Niedner-Schatteburg, 2014

Gereon Niedner-Schatteburg (born 21 November 1959, as Niedner) is a German physicist and chemist. He is professor of physical chemistry at the department of chemistry of the University of Kaiserslautern. Since 2011 he acts as director of the DFG-funded transregional collaborative research center SFB/TRR 88 3MET.de.

== Professional career ==
Niedner-Schatteburg received his secondary school certificate 1975 in Kreiensen and graduated from a high school of economics 1978 in Northeim. He then served compulsory military service with the German Navy. From 1979 to 1988 he studied mathematics and physics at the University of Göttingen and received in 1988 a doctoral degree for his thesis on charge exchange and inelastic scattering in proton molecule collisions which comprised work that he has conducted as a research assistant at the local Max-Planck Institute in the group of Jan Peter Toennies. As a postdoctoral researcher in the group of Yuan T. Lee at the department of chemistry, University of California, Berkeley, Niedner-Schatteburg conducted research on the infrared spectroscopy of isolated molecular clusters. Subsequently, he accepted a position as research assistant (C1) in physical chemistry at the Technical University of Munich with Vladimir E. Bondybey, where he habilitated in chemistry with a thesis on structure and reactivity of ionic metal and molecule clusters via Fourier-Transform-Ion-Cyclotron-Resonance (FT-ICR) – mass spectrometry.

Holding a position as senior associate scientist (C2) and "Privatdozent" he continued to work at the Technical University of Munich for four more years, in between substituting a vacant chair in physical chemistry in 2000 (em. Prof. E.W. Schlag). In the same year he received and accepted the call to a chair in physical chemistry at the University of Kaiserslautern (succession to Hans-Georg Kuball). From 2001 bis 2008 he served as dean of studies, dean and vice dean of the chemistry department, and as a member of the senate of the university. Since 2011 he is elected director of the 3MET.de research center, which he has initiated together with Manfred Kappes (Karlsruhe Institute of Technology, KIT). Since 2008 he acts as vice director of the State Research Center OPTIMAS, supporting its director Martin Aeschlimann. In 2014 to 2016 he served as director of the topical division of molecular physics in the German Physical Society (DPG). He was holding Visiting Professorships at the Institute of Atomic and Molecular Sciences (IAMS) of the Academia Sinica in Taipei, Taiwan (2000) and at the Laboratoire Chimie-Physique (LCP) of the University Paris-South in Orsay, Frankreich (2005), as well as a visiting fellowship at the Yale University in New Haven, USA (2013). His doctoral thesis won him the Reimar Lüst – fellowship of the president of the Max-Planck-society. Niedner-Schatteburg is the managing director of the Steinhofer endowment at the University of Kaiserslautern, and he serves as complimentary director of the nonprofit association at the Hohenstaufen Gymnasium high school in Kaiserslautern. He is married and has two grown-up children.

== Research ==
Niedner-Schatteburg conducts and directs research on reactions with size selected clusters of metals and molecules when held in isolation. His current focus is on the kinetics and on the spectroscopy of transition metal complexes and clusters aiming at the activation of small molecules. He searches for applications of oligo nuclear transition metal complexes as homogeneous catalysts, as single molecule magnets, and as optical effectors. His experiments combine Ion traps for high resolution mass spectrometry with pulsed infrared lasers and polarized X-ray radiation as available by the BESSY II synchrotron light source of the Helmholtz – center in Berlin. Niedner-Schatteburg has published more than 100 scientific publications and several review articles.
