= Hans-Joachim Lauth =

German political scientist

Hans-Joachim Lauth (born 1957 in Mannheim) is a German political scientist. He has been the incumbent of the Chair of Comparative Politics and Systems Theory at the Institute of Political Science and Sociology (IPS) at the Julius Maximilian University of Würzburg. Lauth is founder and responsible editor of the bilingual journal "Zeitschrift für Vergleichende Politikwissenschaft / German Journal of Comparative Politics".

== Career ==
From 1991 to 1996, he was a research assistant in the fields of international politics, development studies and comparative government at the University of Mainz. From 1996 to 2002 he was a research assistant (C 1) in the area of analysis and comparison of political systems. From 2002 to 2004 Lauth held a three-semester substitute professorship at the Institute of Political Science at the University of Koblenz-Landau, Campus Landau in der Pfalz, and from 2004 to 2005 a three-semester substitute professorship at the Institute of Political Science at the University of Heidelberg. From 2005 to 2008, he taught as a professor at the Institute of Political Science at the FernUniversität in Hagen and was spokesperson for the DVPW working group on Intercultural Comparison of Democracies.

Since 2008, he has held the Chair of Comparative Politics and Systems Theory at the Institute of Political Science and Sociology (IPS) at the Julius Maximilian University of Würzburg. From 2009 to 2011, he served as executive director of the Institute of Political Science and Sociology in Würzburg, and from 2010 to 2013, he was a member of the Faculty Council of the Faculty of Philosophy II and Dean of Studies of the Faculty of Philosophy II at the University of Würzburg. Since 2010, he has been deputy director of the graduate school Law, Economics & Society (GSLES). From 2013 to 2019, he was a member and vice-chairman of the Senate of the University of Würzburg. From 2015 to 2019, he was Chairman of the Senate of the University of Würzburg.

== Research projects ==
=== Democracy Matrix ===
DFG research project headed by Hans-Joachim Lauth: The Democracy Matrix is an instrument for measuring democratic quality. Based on data from the Varieties of Democracy project (V-Dem), the Democracy Matrix provides information for about 200 states in the period between 1900 and 2017. The democratic quality of political systems is captured by three dimensions, five institutions and 15 matrix fields as well as three measurement levels. Thus, a disaggregated and differentiated measurement system is realized to trace transformation processes and identify quality and democracy profiles.

== Books ==
- Der Staat in Lateinamerika. Die Staatskonzeption von Guillermo O'Donnell. Saarbrücken 1985, ISBN 3-88156-301-6.
- Mexiko zwischen traditioneller Herrschaft und Modernisierung. Die Gewerkschaften im Wandel von Politik und Wirtschaft (1964–1988). Münster 1991, ISBN 3-88660-717-8.
- Michael Becker, Gert Pickel (Hrsg.): Rechtsstaat und Demokratie. Theoretische und empirische Studien zum Recht in der Demokratie. Wiesbaden 2001, ISBN 978-3-531-13645-5.
- Demokratie und Demokratiemessung. Eine konzeptionelle Grundlegung für den interkulturellen Vergleich. Wiesbaden 2004, ISBN 3-531-13855-3.
- Detlef Jahn, Gert Pickel und Susanne Pickel: Methoden der vergleichenden Politikwissenschaft. Wiesbaden 2008, ISBN 978-3-531-16194-5.
- mit Gert Pickel und Susanne Pickel: Vergleich politischer Systeme. Paderborn 2014, ISBN 3-8252-4000-2.
- Methoden der vergleichenden Politikwissenschaft, Wiesbaden 2008, zusammen mit Gert Pickel und Susanne Pickel, 2. aktualisierte und erweiterte Auflage Wiesbaden 2015, ISBN 978-3-658-08635-0.

== Publications (selection) ==
- Hans‐Joachim Lauth (2000) Informal Institutions and Democracy, Democratization, 7:4, 21-50, DOI: 10.1080/13510340008403683
- Lauth, Hans-Joachim, and Jenniver Sehring. "Putting deficient Rechtsstaat on the research agenda: reflections on diminished subtypes." Comparative Sociology 8.2 (2009): 165-201.
- Lauth, H.-J. (2011). Quality Criteria for Democracy. Why Responsiveness is not the Key. In: Erdmann, G., Kneuer, M. (eds) Regression of Democracy?. VS Verlag für Sozialwissenschaften. https://doi.org/10.1007/978-3-531-93302-3_3
- Lauth, H.-J. (2015): Formal and Informal Institutions, in: Jennifer Gandhi and Rubén Ruiz-Rufino (eds.): Handbook of Comparative Political Institutions, London / New York (Routledge Press) 2015, 56-69
- Lauth, H.-J. (2016). The internal relationships of the dimensions of democracy: The relevance of trade-offs for measuring the quality of democracy. International Political Science Review, 37(5), 606–617. https://doi.org/10.1177/0192512116667630
- Landman, T., & Lauth, H. (2019). Political Trade-Offs: Democracy and Governance in a Changing World. Politics and Governance, 7(4), 237-242. doi:https://doi.org/10.17645/pag.v7i4.2642
- Neubert, D., Lauth, HJ., Mohamad-Klotzbach, C. (2022). Local Self-governance and Varieties of Statehood: Reflections on Tensions and Cooperation. In: Neubert, D., Lauth, HJ., Mohamad-Klotzbach, C. (eds) Local Self-Governance and Varieties of Statehood. Contributions to Political Science. Springer, Cham. https://doi.org/10.1007/978-3-031-14996-2_1
- Lauth, H.-J., Schlenkrich, O., & Lemm, L. (2023). Different types of deficient democracies: Reassessing the relevance of diminished subtypes. International Political Science Review, 44(2), 212–229. https://doi.org/10.1177/0192512121995686
