= Johannes Drerup =

German philosopher of education (born 1981)

Johannes Drerup (born 7 September 1981) is a German philosopher of education. He is a professor of philosophy of education and educational theory at TU Dortmund University and VU Amsterdam.

== Biography ==
Drerup studied philosophy, education and English studies at the University of York, England, and University of Münster, Germany, where he received his PhD in 2013. From 2014 to 2019, he was a substitute professor at the University of Koblenz and Landau, Germany. Since October 2019, Johannes Drerup has been a full professor at TU Dortmund University. Since May 2019, he has been a guest professor at Vrije Universiteit Amsterdam, the Netherlands. In 2022 he was a Fulbright visiting scholar at the University of California, Berkeley, US.

== Research ==
Drerup's research focuses on the philosophy of education, the philosophy of childhood, educational ethics, and the theory and practice of moral and democratic education. Drerup is member of the editorial board of the German journal Zeitschrift für Erziehungswissenschaft (ZfE) and is co-founder and editor of the international open access journal "On Education".

== Bibliography (selection) ==
- 2023: The Cambridge Handbook of Democratic Education (ed. with Julian Culp and Douglas Yacek). Cambridge: Cambridge University Press.
- 2022: Kinder, Corona und die Folgen. Eine kritische Bestandsaufnahme. Frankfurt am Main: Campus.
- 2022: Liberal Democratic Education: A Paradigm in Crisis (ed. with Julian Culp, Isolde de Groot, Anders Schinkel and Douglas Yacek). Münster: Mentis.
- 2022: Creating Green Citizens. Bildung, Demokratie und der Klimawandel (ed. with Franziska Felder, Veronika Magyar-Haas and Gottfried Schweiger).
- 2021: Kontroverse Themen im Unterricht. Konstruktiv streiten lernen. Stuttgart: Reclam.
- 2020: Pädagogische Debatten. Themen, Strukturen und Öffentlichkeit (with Ulrich Binder und Jürgen Oelkers). Stuttgart: Kohlhammer.
- 2019: Handbuch Philosophie der Kindheit (ed. with Gottfried Schweiger). Berlin: J. B. Metzler.
- 2013: Paternalismus, Perfektionismus und die Grenzen der Freiheit. Paderborn, München, Wien, Zürich: Ferdinand Schöningh.
