= Niedner =

Niedner is a surname. Notable people with the surname include:

- Adolph Otto Niedner (1863–1954), American gunsmith
- Christian Wilhelm Niedner (1797–1865), German historian and theologian
- Gereon Niedner-Schatteburg (born 1959), German physicist and chemist
