= Robert Wetherhold =

American engineer

Robert C. Wetherhold is an American mechanical engineer.

Wetherhold attended the University of Delaware from 1969 to 1983, earning his undergraduate and graduate degrees before joining the University at Buffalo faculty. He was a Fulbright fellow at the University of Kaiserslautern from 1997 to 1998. In 2011, Wetherhold was elected a fellow of the American Society of Mechanical Engineers. He retired from the University at Buffalo in 2022.
