= Gerhard Blickle =

German psychology professor

Gerhard Blickle (born 1959) is a German psychologist and Professor of Industrial, Organizational, and Business Psychology in the Department of Psychology at the University of Bonn, which has been designated a University of Excellence under Germany's national Excellence Strategy in recognition of its outstanding research.

== Life and education ==
Blickle studied psychology, business administration, and law at the Universities of Tübingen, Heidelberg, and Mannheim. He received his Diploma in Psychology (roughly equivalent to a master's degree) from Heidelberg University in 1987 and earned his doctorate there with distinction in 1993. In 1996, he received the Max Weber Prize for Business Ethics for his work Kommunikationsethik im Management (Communication Ethics in Management). In 1997, he completed his habilitation and was awarded the venia legendi in psychology by the University of Koblenz-Landau. The habilitation is an advanced postdoctoral qualification in the German academic system that formally demonstrates the ability to conduct independent research and teach at the university level. From 2001 to 2003, Blickle served as Professor of Industrial and Organizational Psychology at the University of Mainz. In 2003, he joined the University of Bonn as Head of the Industrial, Organizational, and Business Psychology unit in the Department of Psychology. His research focuses on mentoring and networking in career development, political skill and emotional intelligence in the workplace, and dark personality traits—particularly Machiavellianism, narcissism, and psychopathy—among organizational leaders.

== Publications ==
- G. Blickle, R. Frieder, G. R. Ferris: Political skill. In: D. S. Ones, N. R. Anderson, H. K. Sinangil, C. Viswesvaran (Hrsg.): The SAGE Handbook of Industrial, Work & Organizational Psychology: Personnel Psychology and Employee Performance. 2nd edition, Vol. 1, Sage, Los Angeles 2018, Chap. 11, S. 299–319.
- G. Blickle, A. Schlegel, P. Fassbender, U. Klein: Some personality correlates of business white-collar crime. In: Applied Psychology: An International Review. Band 55, 2006, S. 220–233.
- R. Hogan, G. Blickle: Socioanalytic Theory: Basic concepts, supporting evidences, and practical implications. In: V. Zeigler-Hill, T. K. Shackelford (Hrsg.): The SAGE Handbook of Personality and Individual Differences. SAGE, Thousand Oaks, CA, 2018, S. 110–129.
- F. Nerdinger, G. Blickle, N. Schaper (Hrsg.): Lehrbuch Arbeits- und Organisationspsychologie. 4. Auflage. Springer, Heidelberg / Berlin / New York 2019.
