= Andreas Bleck =

German politician

Member of the Bundestag
- Incumbent
- Assumed office 24 October 2017

Personal details
- Born: 17 April 1988 (age 37)
- Party: AfD

Andreas Bleck (born 17 April 1988) is a German politician for the populist party Alternative for Germany (AfD), and since 2017 a member of the Bundestag, the German federal parliament.

== Life and achievements ==
Bleck was born 1988 in the west German town of Neuwied, and attended the University of Koblenz and Landau with the intention of becoming a teacher.

Bleck was a member of the centre-right Christian Democratic Union of Germany (CDU) from 2010 to 2013.

In 2013 he entered the newly founded populist AfD and was member of the advisory council of the party youth organisation, the Young Alternative for Germany.

In 2017 Bleck was elected a member of the Bundestag.

He is a denier of man-made climate change.

Bleck retained his seat in the 2021 German federal election, and is a member of the 20th Bundestag, which is currently seated.
