= Cologne Round Table =

Cooperation of German student organizations

The Kölner Runde (Cologne Round Table) is a cooperation of six of Germany's leading student organizations, namely AIESEC, bonding, BDSU (Confederation of German Junior Enterprises, see also JADE), ELSA, MARKET TEAM, and MTP. Founded in 1991, it has grown to an important platform for inter-organizational knowledge management.
