= Martin Aeschlimann =

Swiss professor of physics

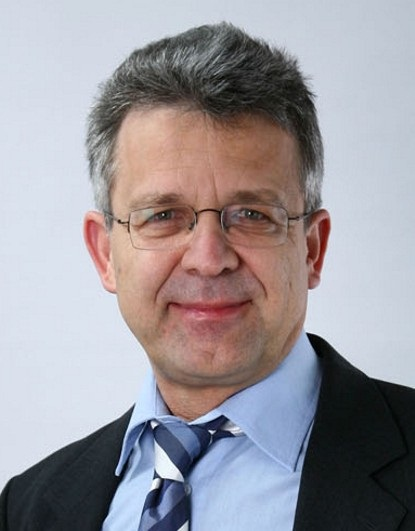
- Born: 12 August 1957 (age 68); Liestal
- Known for: Nanoparticles, Electrodynamics, Material sciences
- Scientific career
- Fields: Experimental physics
- Institutions: ETH Zürich; National Institute of Standards and Technology; University of Rochester; University of Duisburg-Essen; University of Kaiserslautern

Martin Aeschlimann (born 1957) is a Swiss physicist and professor in the physics department of the University of Kaiserslautern. Since 2008 he is the spokesman of the State Research Center for Optics and Material Sciences (OPTIMAS).

== Academic career ==
Aeschlimann studied experimental physics at the ETH Zürich (1980–1985) and was awarded his Ph.D. in physics for his thesis "Magnetism at Surfaces and Ultrafast Magnetization Reversal Studies with Spin-Polarized Photoemission" in 1989. From 1985 to 1989 Aeschlimann was assistant to Prof. H. C. Siegmann at the laboratory for solid-state physics at ETH Zürich. From 1989 to 1990 he had a postdoctoral position at the National Institute of Standards and Technology in Washington, D.C. The following year Aeschlimann became a research associate at the NSF-Center for Photoinduced Charge Transfer at the University of Rochester. From 1993 to 1998 he was a member of the research staff at the laboratory of technical chemistry at ETH Zürich. In November 1996 he habilitated with his thesis: "Time Resolved Studies of Electron Relaxation at Metal Surfaces" followed by his promotion to professor of experimental physics at the University of Duisburg-Essen. In July 2000 he accepted a permanent position as professor of the physics department at the University of Kaiserslautern. Aeschlimann was spokesperson of the Deutsche Physikalische Gesellschaft (DPG) professional association on surface science (2008–2010). From 2008 to 2015 he was spokesperson of the Deutsche Forschungsgemeinschaft(DFG) priority program 1391 "Ultrafast Nanooptics". Since 2008 Aeschlimann is spokesperson of the State Research Center for Optics and Material Sciences (OPTIMAS) and starting 2016 spokesperson of the DFG transregional collaborative research center Spin in its collective environment (Spin+X, SFB/TRR173). 2015-2018 he is elected as speaker of the Condensed Matter Section (SKM) of the Deutsche Physikalische Gesellschaft (DPG). The section represents more than 18 0000 members in 13 divisions. Since 2009 Aeschlimann is Member of the Editorial Board of the magazine New Journal of Physics.

== Research ==
Aeschlimann's research program is devoted to the investigation of ultrafast phenomena in solids, on interfaces and in nanoparticles. The focus is directed to the dynamics of electrons, plasmons, phonons and spin at the space-time limit. For the experimental approach, novel methods are constantly developed for measuring ultrafast relaxation processes in real time with high temporal and spatial resolution. This is in general achieved by combining ultrashort pulsed laser systems with surface science technology, nano optics and magnetism. Currently, time-resolved photoemission (ARPES, PEEM, momentum microscopy) and time-resolved magneto-optical effects are implemented with laser pulses in visible light and the soft X-ray region.

== Awards and honours ==
Profil-II award of the Swiss National Science Foundation.

== Publications ==
Aeschlimann has published more than 200 articles in peer-reviewed international scientific journals,
