= State Research Center for Optics and Material Sciences =

Physics institute

The State Research Center for Optics and Material Sciences (OPTIMAS) is a research center associated with the University of Kaiserslautern within the framework of the research initiative of the state of Rhineland-Palatinate that pursues research in the areas of laser physics, photonics and plasmonics.

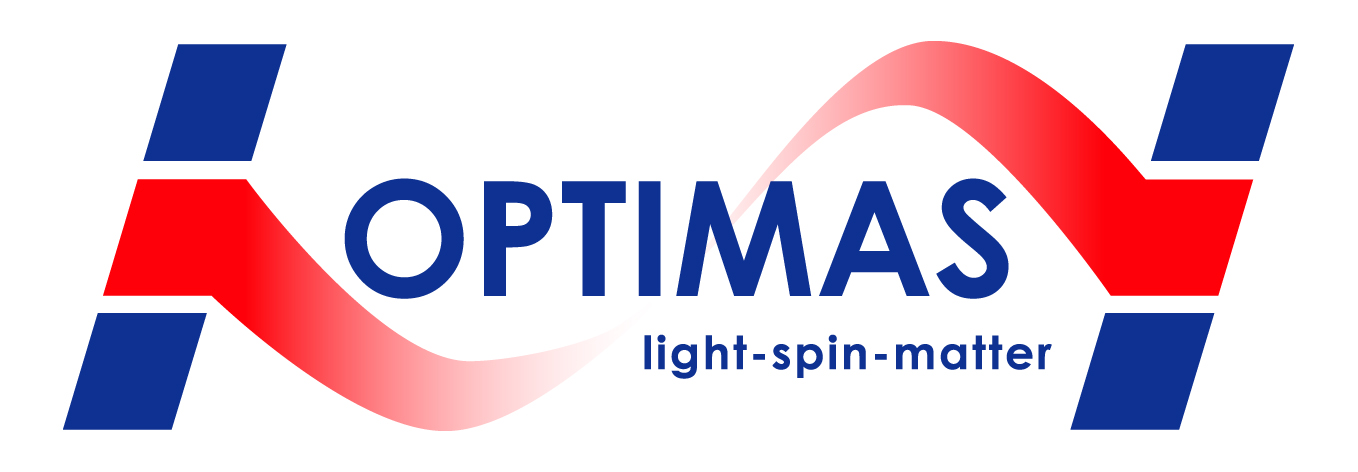
OPTIMAS Research light-spin-matter

== Members ==
Research groups from four different departments at TU Kaiserslautern – Physics, Chemistry, Electrical and Computer Engineering, as well as Mechanical and Process Engineering – are members of OPTIMAS. Several additional research centers and institutions are also members:

- the Nano Structuring Center TU Kaiserslautern,
- the Institut für Oberflächen- und Schichtanalytik (Institute for Surface Science and Thin-film Analysis, IFOS)
- the Institut für Verbundwerkstoffe (Institute for Composites Materials, IVW),
- the Department "Materials Characterization and Testing" of the Fraunhofer Institut für Physikalische Messtechnik (Fraunhofer Institute for Physical Measurement Techniques, Freiburg).

The current manager of operations at OPTIMAS is, Professor Martin Aeschlimann.

== Transregional Collaborative Research Centers ==
Under the roof of OPTIMAS five Transregional Collaborative Research Centers (CRC = Sonderforschungsbereich SFB) of the German Science Foundation (DFG) are operated:

- SFB/TRR 49 „Condensed Matter Systems with Variable Many-Body Interactions”, since 07/2007, together with University of Frankfurt and University of Mainz, as well as Max Planck Institute for Polymer Research, and
- SFB/TRR 88 3MET „Cooperative Effects in Homo- and Heterometallic Complexes“, since 01/2011, together with Karlsruhe Institute of Technology (KIT).
- SFB 926 „Microscale Morphology of Component Surfaces (MICOS)“, since 07/2011;
- SFB/TRR 173 Spin+X „Spin in its collective environment”, since 01/2016, together with University of Mainz;
- SFB/TRR 185 OSCAR „Open System Control of Atomic and Photonic Matter“, since 07/2016, together with University of Bonn.

In addition, OPTIMAS is associated with the Graduate School of Excellence “Materials Science in Mainz (MAINZ)” which is coordinated by the University of Mainz. This graduate program is financed since 2007 in the framework of the German Universities Excellence Initiative.

== Sources ==
Homepage OPTIMAS
