= University of Koblenz and Landau =

Defunct German university

- Universität Koblenz-Landau
- Type: Public
- Active: 1 October 1990–1 January 2023
- Budget: € 41.5 million
- Chancellor: Michael Ludewig
- President: May-Britt Kallenrode
- Vice-president: Harald von Korflesch, Gabriele Schaumann
- Students: 17,764 (2022)
- Location: Koblenz, Landau, and Mainz, Rhineland-Palatinate, Germany
- Website: www.uni-koblenz-landau.de

The University of Koblenz and Landau (German: Universität Koblenz-Landau) was a German public university located in Koblenz and Landau, Rhineland-Palatinate, which primarily focused on teacher education.

After starting to reform its teacher education in the 1960s, Rhineland-Palatinate merged several schools of education to form the Erziehungswissenschaftliche Hochschule Rheinland-Pfalz (EWH) (College for Pedagogy Rhineland-Palatinate) in 1969, which grew in size and status until it was formally closed and restructured as a proper university in 1990. The new university was unique in Germany in that it had two campuses that were on opposite ends of the state and essentially functioned as two separate universities, complete with their own staffs, administration and student culture, with little to no interaction with their counterparts. To not privilege one campus, the president's office and central administration were located in the state capital Mainz.

After years of criticism of this convoluted, inefficient and expensive structure, the state restructured its universities, leading the university to formally disband in 2023. The Koblenz campus was repurposed as the University of Koblenz, while the Landau campus was merged with the Technical University of Kaiserslautern to form the University of Kaiserslautern-Landau.

== History ==
=== Predecessor organisations (1903–1990) ===
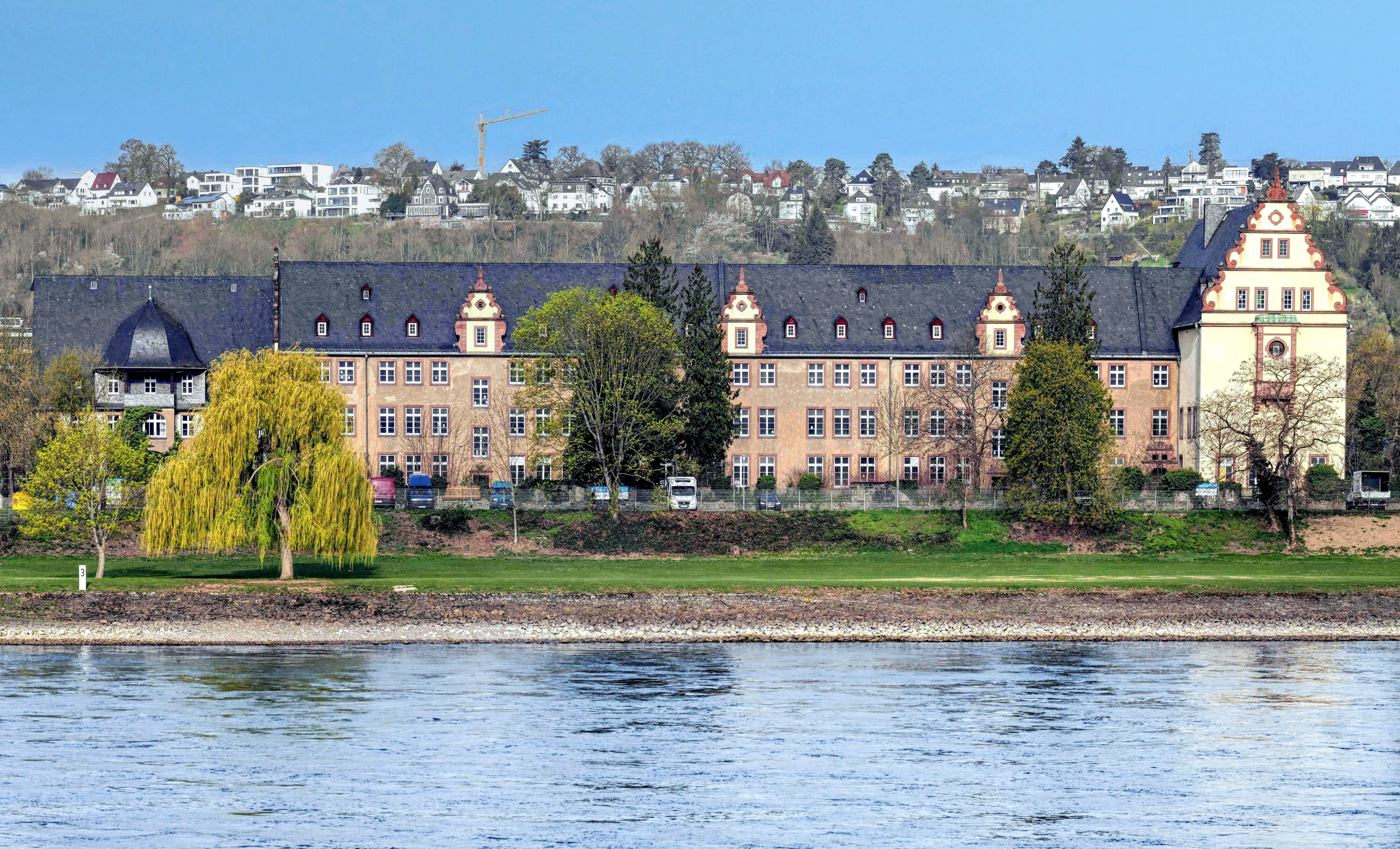
The former Königlich Preußisches Lehrerinnenseminar Koblenz, seen from the Rhine. The building housed the Koblenz campus until 2002.

Despite being one of the youngest universities in Germany even when it was closed, the University of Koblenz and Landau traced its legacy back to the early 20th century. As early as 1903, the government of Prussia founded the Königlich Preußisches Lehrerinnenseminar Koblenz, a facility to train female teachers located in the suburb of Koblenz-Oberwerth. With the fall of Prussia following World War I, the institution was closed in 1925 and again reopened as a school of education for female teachers (Hochschule für Lehrerinnenbildung) in 1937. After World War II, a Pädagogische Akademie opened in Andernach in 1946, and moved to the former Oberwerth institution in 1950, where teachers were trained, separated by gender, school type and religious confession. This move was mainly made possible because the state government of Rhineland-Palatinate moved its state capital from Koblenz to Mainz, thus freeing the buildings, which had previously housed most government institutions. In 1960, it was upgraded to the rank of a minor college (Pädagogische Hochschule) and over the coming years, the separations were mostly dropped when surrounding smaller colleges for different genders or confessions were closed.

Meanwhile, Landau became the host of a Pädagogische Akademie in 1949, when the previous location for the Pfalz, Kirchheimbolanden, proved too small and remote. The Catholic-only Akademie was originally intended to move to Speyer, seat of the Roman Catholic Diocese, with Kaiserslautern and Ludwigshafen also being discussed as possible locations, however; this move could not be realized and the Akademie remained. Like its Koblenz counterpart, it was upgraded to a Pädagogische Hochschule in 1960 and dropped the segregations. In the beginning, the Akademie used the building of a former trade school, while the students were housed in makeshift barracks. As Landau was a rural town, the ruins of the old Festung Landau allowed to create a spacious campus in the 1960s, where the university has remained since.

As intended by a law that mandated all Pädagogische Hochschulen to be dissolved on 1 October 1969, both institutions in Koblenz and Landau were merged with similar ones in Mainz and Worms to form the Erziehungswissenschaftliche Hochschule Rheinland-Pfalz (EWH) (College for Pedagogy Rhineland-Palatinate), completely forsaking the previous separation by religion and gender while pooling teacher education for different school types to one single institution. This was in line with state politics of the time that sought to upgrade and academize teacher education, which did not necessarily require a university degree before. Following the merger, the teacher education consequently bestowed a proper university degree, the Diplom, while other subjects not related to teaching such as psychology and degrees such as the magister artium were established, paving the way to form a proper university. As the job market for teachers became unattractive in the 1970s, student numbers plummeted and in 1978, the location in Worms was closed and succeeded by a different Fachhochschule, while the Mainz location for special education was merged into the University of Mainz in 1985, with only the president's office and central administration remaining in the state capital. As the then-Minister of Education of Rhineland-Palatinate, Bernhard Vogel, recalled decades later, Koblenz and Landau were undebatable as locations due to local politics and the distribution of the other universities in the state, while Worms and Mainz were always intended to be merged with the bigger University of Mainz. As another high-ranking official of the time mused, using the EWH as a setup for a proper university had proven to be the right decision, as it gave the state government time to weather the paradigm shift towards academization in teacher education, allowed for superfluous locations to close, and created the possibility to test and establish new subjects. Furthermore, the EWH was one of the pioneering institutions for the then-new computer science, a foundation which would lead to the University of Koblenz-Landau remaining a reputed location for these studies despite its small size.

=== Formation, expansion and closure (1990–2023) ===
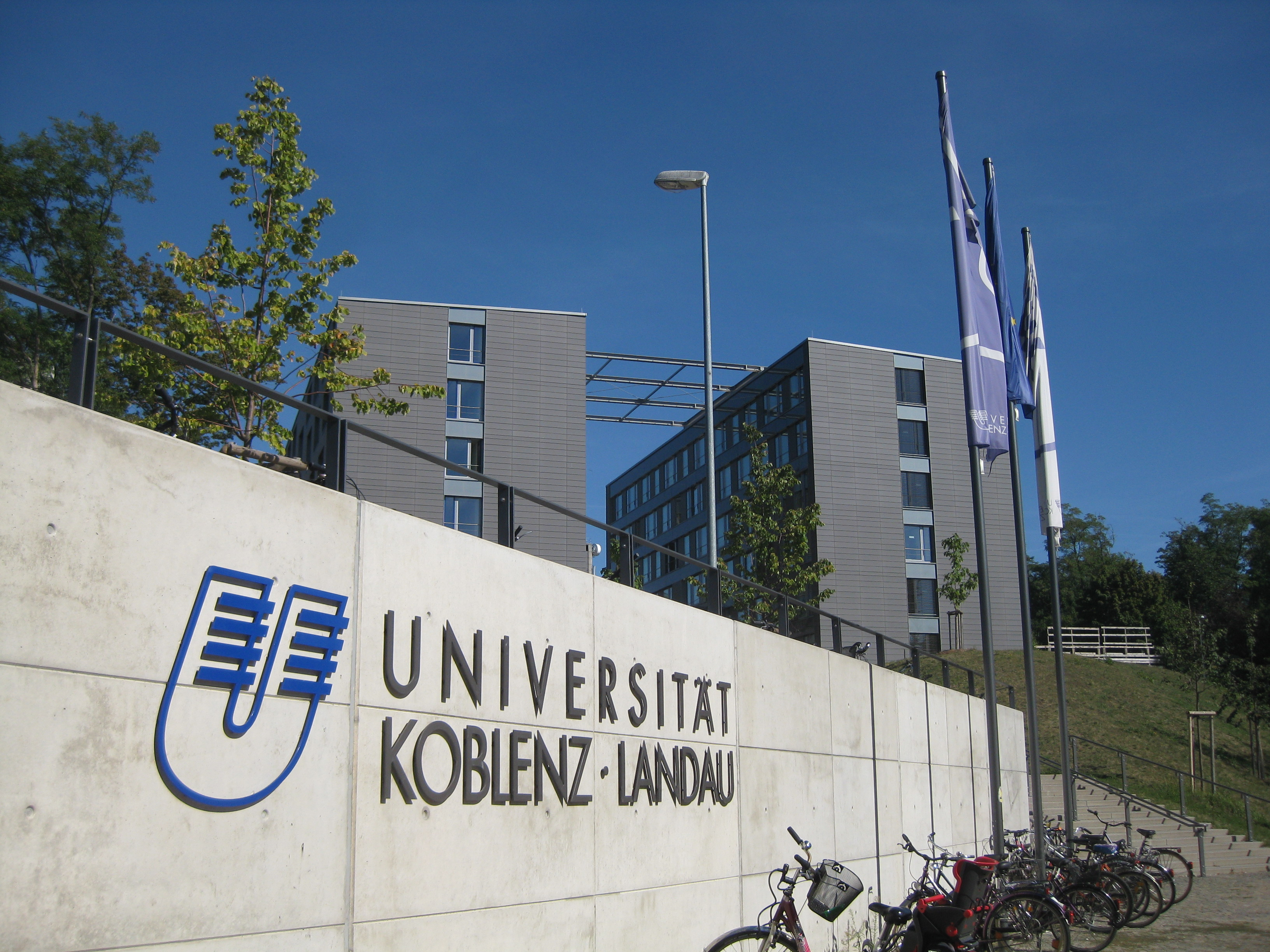
The university's logo seen on the Landau campus

On 1 October 1990, the EWH was closed and immediately reopened as the University of Koblenz and Landau, as mandated by a state law ratified on 8 June 1990. This was largely done as the growing Hochschule was formerly structured beneath a university, yet the EWH already possessed all rights exclusive to a "proper" university, such as the power to grant PhDs and Habilitations, and essentially functioned as one. There was little debate to restructure the university, as the rebranding posed little to no cost while greatly boosting the institution's standing, and all parties except the Green Party supported the bill. When it was founded, the university followed the doctrine that all subjects had to be taught at each location, as to not disadvantage certain students or force them to take specific combinations. However; the logistics of dividing yet coordinating each subject over two locations proved difficult and largely inefficient, which is why the university opted to have Koblenz and Landau have a different subject range unique to each location. In total, the university featured eight faculties: pedagogy, philology and cultural studies, mathematics and natural science, as well as computer science were located in Koblenz, while in Landau special education (which was again relocated from Mainz in 1991), cultural and social studies, natural science and environmental studies as well as psychology were taught. To not privilege one campus, the president's office and central administration remained in the state capital of Mainz. This led to a structure unique in Germany, as not only were the two campuses at other ends of the state but the university was governed from a third, "secret" location barely discussed publicly.

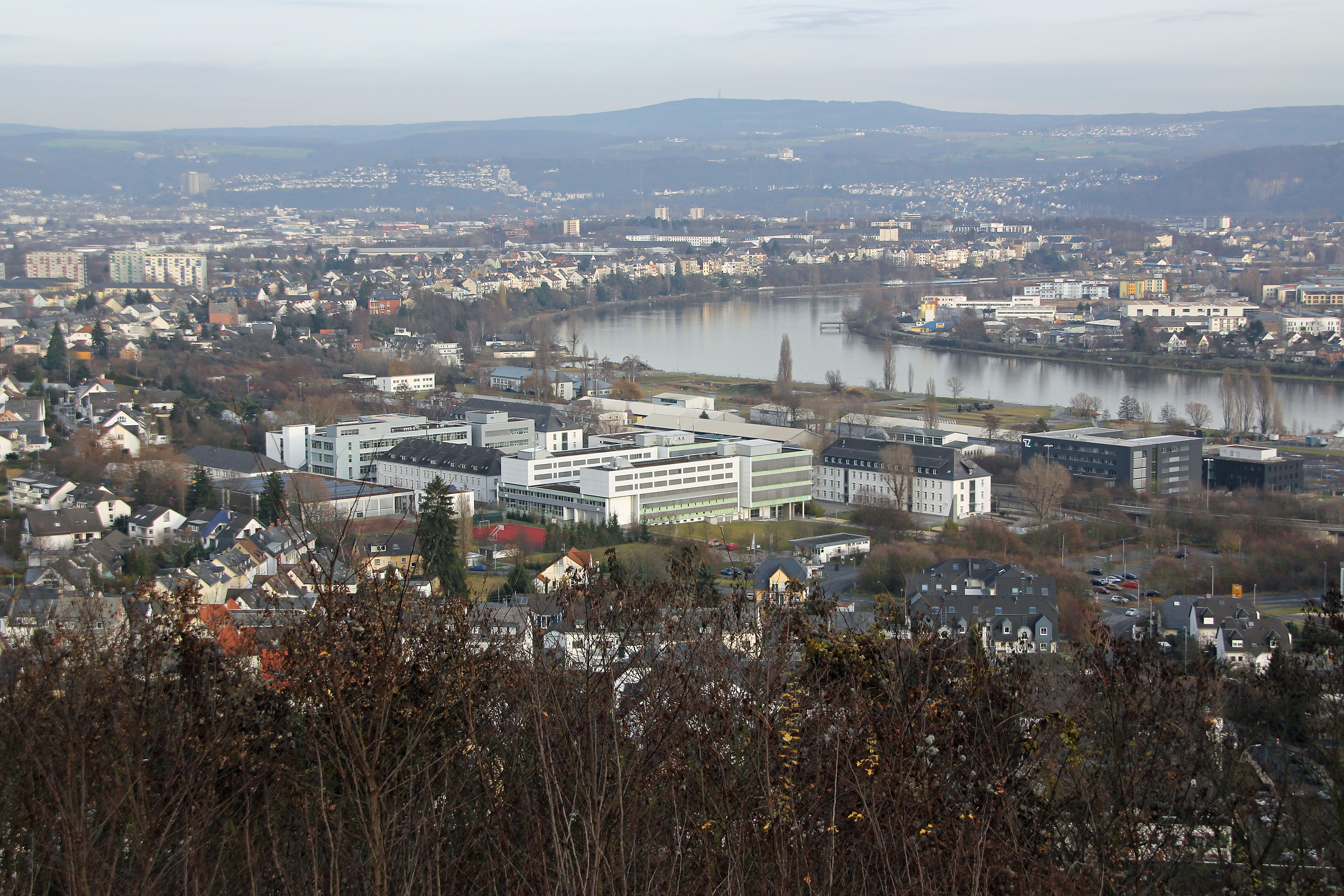
The new Koblenz campus in Koblenz-Metternich as seen from the Metternicher Eule.

Since 1990, the number of students had more than quadrupled. There were almost 18,000 students registered by the time the university was closed, making it the second largest university in Rhineland-Palatinate after the University of Mainz. To accommodate them and combat constant overcrowding, the Koblenz campus left its established location in Oberwerth and relocated to the premises of the former Pionier-Kaserne (Metternich) in Koblenz-Metternich in 2002. Nevertheless, overcrowding remained one of its biggest challenges throughout its existence, as the number of students grew faster than new buildings could be added, constantly leading to debates over funding and expansion. As mandated by the Bologna Process, the university was one of the first to change all of its degrees into the Bachelor and Master system, forsaking the then-typical Diplom.

After years of criticism of the convoluted, inefficient and expensive structure with three separate locations, the state decided to again restructure the university in 2019 passed a corresponding law on 15 October 2020. On 1 January 2023, the Koblenz campus was formally repurposed as the University of Koblenz, while the Landau campus was merged with the closer Technical University of Kaiserslautern to form the University of Kaiserslautern-Landau and the Mainz office was closed, officially disbanding the university. According to a spokesperson of the university, both new institutions would profit by getting more funds, staff and faculties as well as new subjects, making them more capable of competing with universities from neighboring states.

== Campus ==
Map of the campus in Landau. The star-shaped structure indicates the walls of the former Festung Landau, on which the campus was built.

When it was founded, the university simply kept using the buildings of the former EWH, the former Königlich Preußisches Lehrerinnenseminar Koblenz, in Koblenz-Oberwerth, a prestigious and central suburb of Koblenz located on an island on the Rhine, and the campus built on the ruins of the former Festung Landau, just outside of Landau, in the 1960s. However, as the number of students had more than quadrupled across both campusses, reaching almost 18,000 students by the time the university was closed, expansions were needed. To combat constant overcrowding, the Koblenz campus thus left its established location in Oberwerth and relocated to the premises of the former Pionier-Kaserne (Metternich) in Koblenz-Metternich, a more rural suburb of Koblenz located by the Moselle, in 2002, while the Landau campus also saw the addition of multiple new buildings in 2004. Both campusses were further expanded in the 2010s. Nevertheless, overcrowding remained one of its biggest challenges throughout its existence, as the number of students grew faster then new buildings could be added, constantly leading to debates over funding and expansion. The central administration in Mainz was so small that it did not warrant the construction of a designated building, so it was moved around several office buildings across Mainz over the years. Additionally, the university featured a centre for distance education located in Koblenz and created in 1991, which was separated from the rest of the university and where multiple degrees and certifications could be obtained.

== Organisation and administration ==
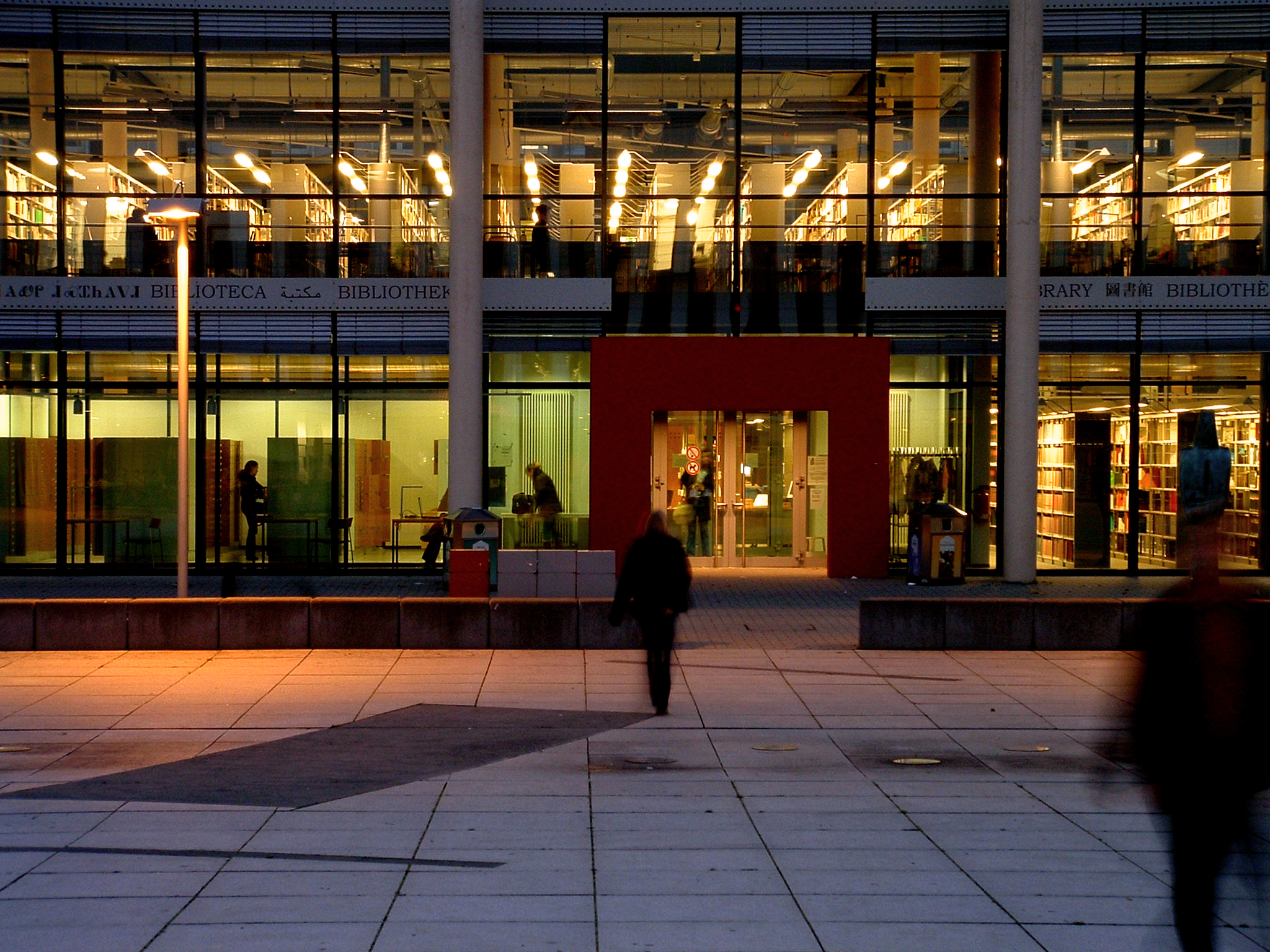
University library at the Koblenz campus seen at night

The university was uniquely organised in accordance to its structure: while it had a president who was located in Mainz, each campus had a vice president who essentially governed their campus without interference from their counterpart. As it is mandatory for all German public universities, tuition was free and it featured an Allgemeiner Studierendenausschuss (AStA) as well as a Studierendenparlament (StuPa), the two bodies for student self-government. Furthermore, the university was a member of the networks Franco-German University (FGU) and Netzwerk Mittelgroße Universitäten (MGU).

Both campuses had many additional centres and offers, such as a cooperation with the Landau Zoo, university lectures for children, a choir and an orchestra, as well as athletics. Of note was also the strong focus on peace at the Landau campus. Founded in 2013, the Friedensakademie Rheinland-Pfalz was located there, which focused on peace education, crisis prevention and civil conflict resolution, seeking to research and strengthen peace efforts globally. Alongside the Frank-Loeb-Institut (FLI), which focussed on dialogue between academics, politics and the broad public and financed a yearly visiting professor, it was located at the Frank-Loebsches Haus in central Landau, the former residence of a locally-known Jewish family. When the university disbanded, both organisations became part of the new University of Kaiserslautern-Landau.

== Academic profile ==
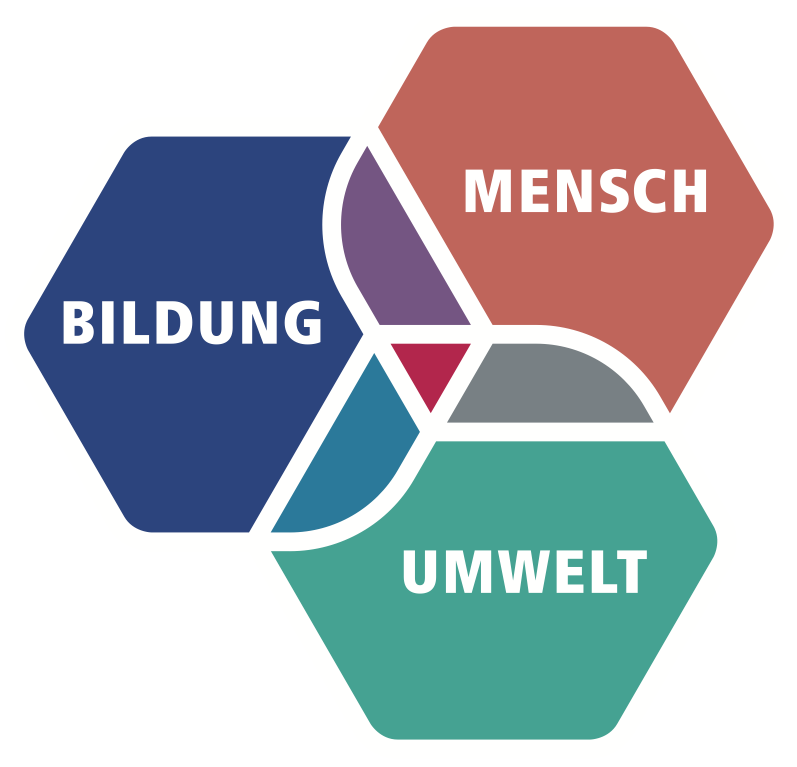
The university's three focal points: education, humanity, and environment (Bildung, Mensch, Umwelt). The graphic shows how they were all supposed to align and blend with each other.

In total, the university featured around 200 degrees across eight faculties: pedagogy, philology and cultural studies, mathematics und natural science, as well as computer science were located in Koblenz, while in Landau special education, cultural and social studies, natural science and environmental studies as well as psychology were taught.

By its own account, the university's profile was distributed across three focal points: education, humanity, and environment (Bildung, Mensch, Umwelt), which were all seen with a broad scope, aligned and blended with each other, with the goal being an interdisciplanry student environment. "Education" was to comprise every aspect of a degree roughly associated with teaching, while "humanity" was to comprise every aspect that could be seen as human science, with "environment" comprising every possible environment known to men. Each program across the eight faculties was to contain all three aspects: for example computer science was a school subject, furthered humanity, and concerned itself with digital environments, whereas social science was also a school subject, researched humanity's relation with each other and studied social environments.

The university's biggest focus was teacher education, which comprised roughly two–thirds of all students. One of the university's biggest draws was that it was one of the few universities in Germany that not only specialized in teacher education, but offered degree programs for all different school types available in the country as well as almost all school subjects. Dating back to the EWH, it was renowned for computer science, while Landau's rural environment made it a great research location for environmental studies and environmental science.

== Notable alumni ==
- Hendrik Beikirch, German graffiti artist
- Andreas Bleck, German politician and member of the Bundestag
- Sonja Christ, German professor for public relations and Moselle Wine Queen
- Peter Gillo, German politician and member of the Landtag of Saarland
- Lea Heidbreder, German politician and member of the Landtag of Rhineland-Palatinate
- Constanze Juchem-Grundmann, German professor for teaching English as a second or foreign language
- Kai Kramosta, German comedian
- Jochen Kuhn (Physikdidaktiker), German professor for physics education
- Bernhard Kukatzki, German historian and politician, member of the Landtag of Rhineland-Palatinate
- Margitta Mazzocchi, German-American politician serving in the West Virginia House of Delegates
- Werner Moskopp, German philosopher
- Marcus Resch, German politician and member of the Landtag of Hesse
- Lisa Ryzih, German pole vaulter
- Célia Šašić, German professional women's association football player
- Rita Wagner, German politician and member of the Landtag of Rhineland-Palatinate
- Nils Wiechmann, German politician and member of the Landtag of Rhineland-Palatinate

== See also ==
- List of colleges and universities
- Koblenz
- Landau
