= Technical University of Kaiserslautern =

German research university

Coordinates: 49°25′26″N 7°45′11″E

- Technische Universität Kaiserslautern
- Type: Public research university
- Active: 1970–2023
- Budget: EUR 208.7 million
- Chancellor: Stefan Lorenz
- President: Arnd Poetzsch-Heffter
- Academic staff: 2,418
- Administrative staff: 233
- Students: 14,869
- Location: Kaiserslautern, Rhineland-Palatinate, Germany
- Website: www.uni-kl.de

Technical University of Kaiserslautern (German: Technische Universität Kaiserslautern, also known as TU Kaiserslautern or TUK) was a public research university in Kaiserslautern, Germany.

On 1 January 2023, the university was merged with the Landau campus of the University of Koblenz-Landau into the University of Kaiserslautern-Landau, or Rheinland-Pfälzische Technische Universität Kaiserslautern-Landau (RPTU) in German.

There were numerous institutes around the university, including two Fraunhofer Institutes (IESE and ITWM), the Max Planck Institute for Software Systems (MPI SWS), the German Research Center for Artificial Intelligence (DFKI), the Institute for Composite Materials (IVW) and the Institute for Surface and Thin Film Analysis (IFOS), all of which cooperate closely with the university.

TU Kaiserslautern was organized into 12 faculties. Approximately 14,869 students were enrolled at the time it closed. The TU Kaiserslautern is part of the Software-Cluster along with the Technische Universität Darmstadt, the Karlsruhe Institute of Technology and Saarland University. The Software-Cluster won the German government's Spitzencluster competition, the equivalence to the German Universities Excellence Initiative for clusters.

== History ==
The University of Kaiserslautern was founded on 13 July 1970 by the state of Rhineland-Palatinate as a constituent member of the twin University of Trier-Kaiserslautern. 191 students matriculated in the winter semester 1970/1971 in the Faculties of Mathematics, Physics and Technology. In 1972 the Faculties of Chemistry and Biology were founded. At the same time the Faculty of Technology was split into the Faculties of Mechanical Engineering and Electrotechnology, Architecture/Regional and Environmental Planning/Educational Sciences.

In 1975 the twin university was split into two independent universities: University of Trier and the University of Kaiserslautern. The Faculties, which were established successively, continuously strengthened the university's scientific character: Electrotechnology (1975), later Electrical and Computer Engineering (1999), Computer Science (1975), Engineering (1975), later Mechanical and Process Engineering (1995), Architecture/Regional and Environmental Planning/Civil Engineering (1978–1979) and Social and Economic Studies (1985). The official name of the university is Technische Universität Kaiserslautern according to the new law on Higher Education of the Land Rhineland Palatinate which came into force on 1 September 2003.

On 1 January 2023, the university was merged with the Landau campus of the University of Koblenz-Landau to form the University of Kaiserslautern-Landau.

== Organization ==
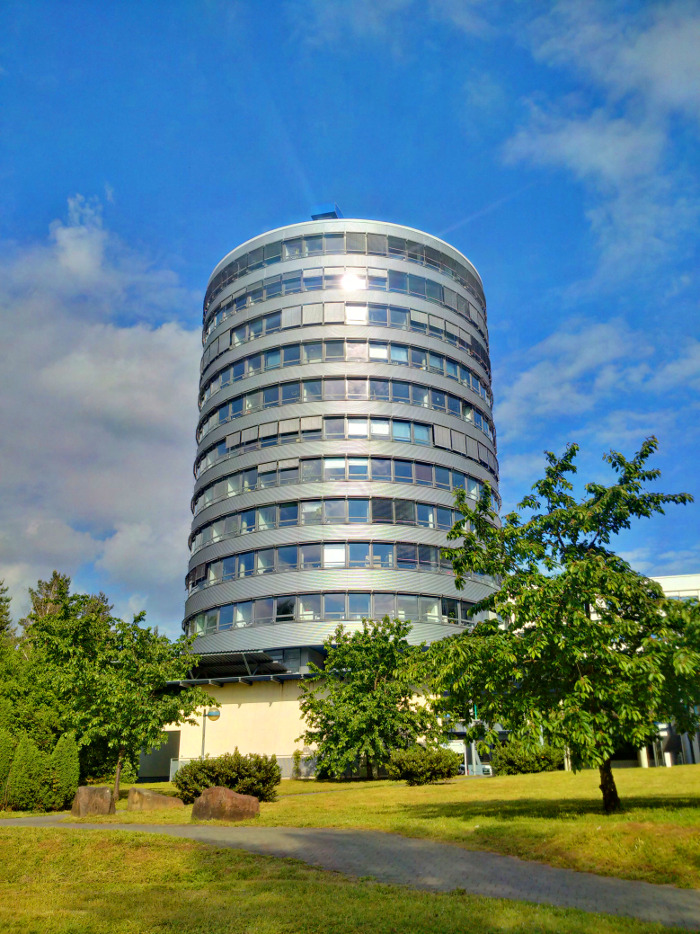
Administration building

=== Faculties ===
These are the 12 faculties in which the university is divided:

- Architecture
- Biology
- Civil Engineering
- Chemistry
- Electrical and Computer Engineering
- Computer Science
- Mechanical and Process Engineering
- Mathematics
- Physics
- Regional and Environmental Planning
- Social Sciences
- Business Studies and Economics

=== Research fields ===
The integration of engineering and natural sciences is one of TU Kaiserslautern's main objectives. The state of Rhineland-Palatinate funds several research initiatives at the University of Kaiserlautern:

- Advanced Materials Engineering (AME)
- Complex Data Analysis in Life and Biotechnology (BioComp)
- State Research Center for Optics and Material Sciences (OPTIMAS)
- Artificial Intelligence Enhanced Cognition and Learning
- Mathematics applied to real-world challenges (MathApp)
- Nanostructured Catalysts (NanoKat)
- Symbolic Tools in Mathematics and their Application (SymbTools)
- Center for Commercial Vehicle Technology (ZNT)

== Sports facilities ==
The university has a Sports Hall in building 28 which includes facilities for badminton, gym, table tennis, etc. Running, hockey, basketball and football can be played in the accompanying sports grounds.

== Associations and student initiatives ==
- Leo-Club Kaiserslautern – a youth organisation of Lions Clubs International.
- Karat Racing Team e.V. – Formula Student team.
- Bonding studentinitiative e.V.
- AEGEE-Kaiserslautern – local group of the European Students' Forum, fostering intercultural exchange and cross-border communication and striving for European integration.
- STEP e.V. – a non-profit organization to support foreign exchange of the Faculty of Business Studies and Economics
- EMECS-thon – an embedded systems marathon open to all students from EMECS consortial universities and partner universities, where the participating teams have 48 hours to develop an embedded systems project from scratch. The event is carried out simultaneously in the universities of the EMECS consortium, as well as in several partner universities each year.
- Muslimische Studierenden Gruppe Kaiserslautern – A non-profit group of University of Kaiserslautern Muslim students.
