= Bonding-studenteninitiative e.V. =

German student society for interships

Official logo of bonding-studenteninitiative e.V.

The bonding-studenteninitiative e.V. (short name bonding) is an independent, non-political and non-profit student organisation. It was founded in 1988 in Aachen, Germany. The name derives from wire bonding, where interconnections between an integrated circuit and its outer world are made.

Its aim is to develop students of engineering and natural sciences for professional life. This aim is mainly followed by the bonding-Firmenkontaktmesse (a job fair) which is organised every year at each location. Additionally, bonding organises company visits, company presentations, case studies, softskill trainings and more. These projects are for free for the participating students.

bonding is a member of the Cologne Round Table (Kölner Runde).

bonding consists of twelve local groups which are mainly located in the technical universities of the following towns in Germany:

- Aachen
- Berlin
- Bochum
- Braunschweig
- Bremen
- Dresden
- Erlangen
- Hamburg
- Kaiserslautern
- Karlsruhe
- Munich
- Stuttgart

== Partner organisations ==
- Canadian Federation of Engineering Students (CFES, since 2005)
- Cologne Round Table (Kölner Runde / Cologne Round Table)
