= RPTU University Kaiserslautern-Landau =

University in Rhineland-Palatinate, Germany

Coordinates: 49°25′26″N 7°45′11″E

- Rheinland-Pfälzische Technische Universität Kaiserslautern-Landau
- Type: Public
- Established: 1 January 2023
- President: Malte Drescher
- Academic staff: Over 1,500
- Total staff: Over 2,600
- Students: About 17,000
- Location: Kaiserslautern and Landau in der Pfalz, Rhineland-Palatinate, Germany
- Website: https://rptu.de/

The RPTU University Kaiserslautern-Landau (German: Rheinland-Pfälzische Technische Universität Kaiserslautern-Landau, also known as RPTU) is a public research university in Kaiserslautern and Landau in der Pfalz, Germany.

The university was formed by the merger of the Technical University of Kaiserslautern and the Landau campus of the University of Koblenz and Landau on 1 January 2023.

There are numerous institutes around the university, including two Fraunhofer Institutes (IESE and ITWM), the Max Planck Institute for Software Systems (MPI-SWS), the German Research Center for Artificial Intelligence (DFKI), the Institute for Composite Materials (IVW) and the Institute for Surface and Thin Film Analysis (IFOS), all of which cooperate closely with the university.

RPTU is organized into 16 faculties. About 17,000 students are enrolled at the moment. RPTU is part of the Software-Cluster along with the Technische Universität Darmstadt, the Karlsruhe Institute of Technology and Saarland University. The Software-Cluster won the German government's Spitzencluster competition, the equivalence to the German Universities Excellence Initiative for clusters.

== History ==
RPTU was founded on 1 January 2023 by the merger of TU Kaiserslautern and the university in Landau. The newly founded university was led by a dual presidential leadership consisting of the former president of the TU Kaiserslautern, Arnd Poetzsch-Heffter, and the former vice-president of the Landau location, Gabriele Schaumann. Since 1 October 2024 Malte Drescher is president of the university.

== Organization ==
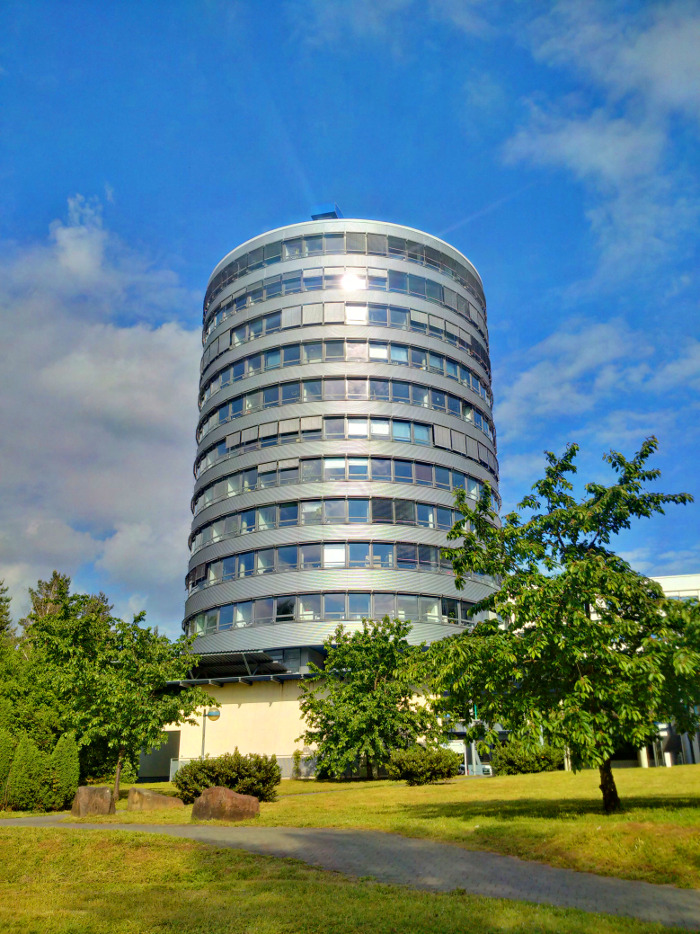
Administration building in Kaiserslautern

=== Faculties ===
These are the 16 faculties in which the university is divided:

- Architecture
- Biology
- Civil Engineering
- Chemistry
- Electrical and Computer Engineering
- Education Sciences
- Computer Science
- Cultural and Social Science
- Mechanical and Process Engineering
- Mathematics
- Natural and Environmental Sciences
- Physics
- Psychology
- Spatial and Environmental Planning
- Social Sciences
- Business Studies and Economics

== Rankings ==
University rankings

Overall – Global & National
THE World 2024	601-800	46-48

In the Times Higher Education World University Rankings of 2024, the university is placed at 601-800 globally and 46-48 within the country.

== Sports facilities ==
The university has a Sports Hall which includes facilities for badminton, gym, table tennis, etc. Running, hockey, basketball and football can be played in the accompanying sports grounds. There are further sports facilities in the Landau campus.

== Associations and student initiatives ==
More than 80 student groups and initiatives are registered at the university.

- Leo-Club Kaiserslautern – a youth organisation of Lions Clubs International.
- Karat Racing Team e.V. – Formula Student team.
- Bonding studentinitiative e.V.
- AEGEE-Kaiserslautern – local group of the European Students' Forum, fostering intercultural exchange and cross-border communication and striving for European integration.
- STEP e.V. – a non-profit organization to support foreign exchange of the Faculty of Business Studies and Economics
- EMECS-thon – an embedded systems marathon open to all students from EMECS consortial universities and partner universities, where the participating teams have 48 hours to develop an embedded systems project from scratch. The event is carried out simultaneously in the universities of the EMECS consortium, as well as in several partner universities each year.
- Muslimische Studierenden Gruppe Kaiserslautern – A non-profit group of University of Kaiserslautern Muslim students.
