= Bibliography of sources in Lucien Lévy-Bruhl's ethnological research =

This is a list of ethnological works used by Lucien Lévy-Bruhl.

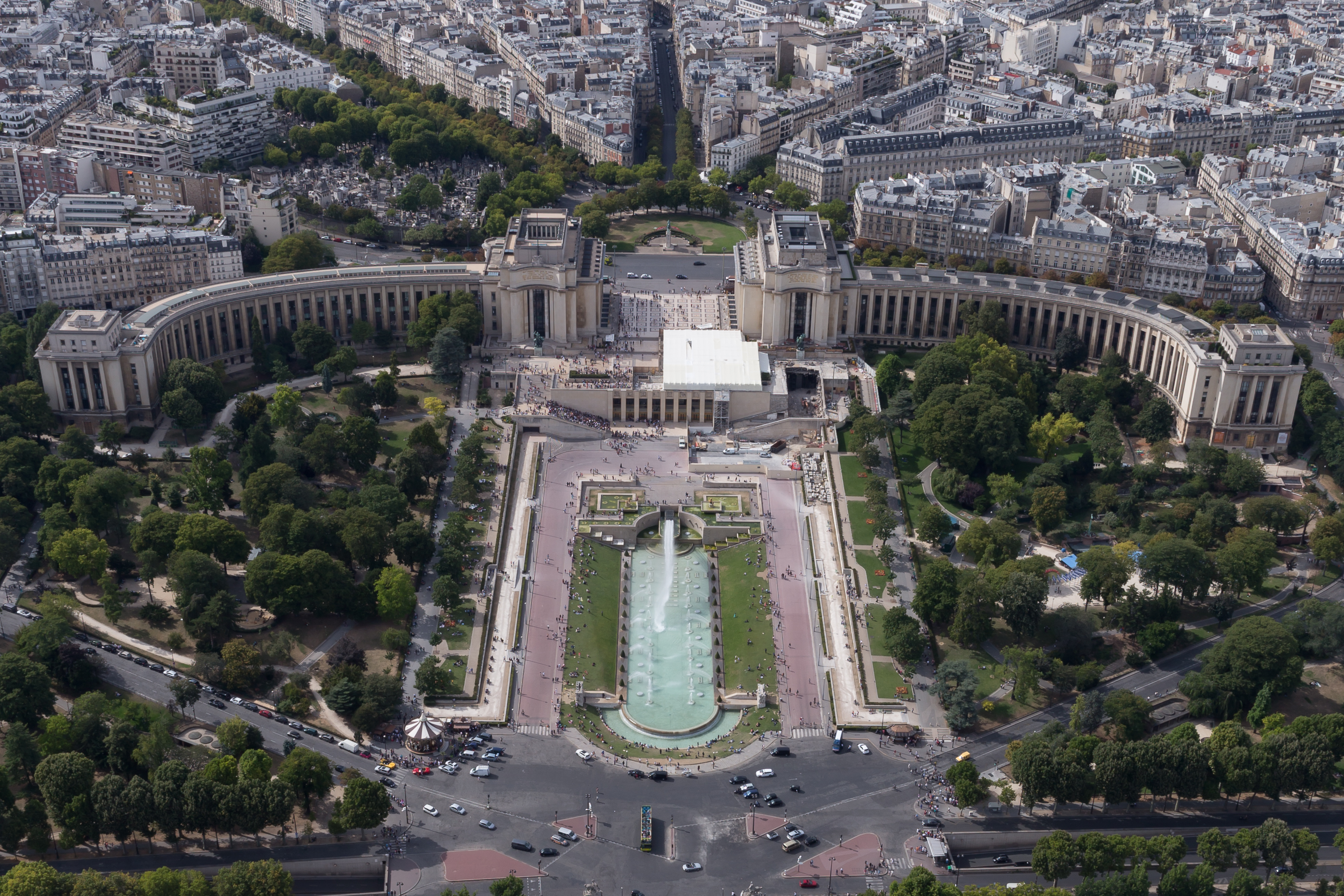
Palais de Chaillot

The following alphabetical overview aims to facilitate and clarify access to the ethnological source material cited by the French scholar Lucien Lévy-Bruhl (1857–1939) by providing various forms of guidance within Wikipedia, with particular emphasis on the sources used in his later works. Our point of departure is La Mythologie primitive (1935), followed by L'Expérience mystique (1938), and culminating in the posthumously published Carnets (1949). The problematic aspects of Lévy-Bruhl's work have been addressed on multiple occasions.

The list includes both the names of the authors cited and the publication series in which their works appeared. Wherever possible, links are provided to existing Wikipedia articles, in some cases to articles in other languages. The primary aim of the list is to enhance the transparency and accessibility of the referenced source material.

Particular attention appears to have been paid to the increasingly modern ethnographic reports that emerged after the founding of the Institut d'ethnologie (Institute of Ethnology) in Paris in 1925, which was affiliated with the University of Paris. These include, for example, contributions published in the journal Oceania, as well as reports from the expeditions of Rasmussen and the works of Landtman, Wirz, Leenhardt, among others. In addition to references to relevant Wikipedia articles, the list incorporates supplementary information and, where available, indications of existing digital reproductions.

This list does not claim to be exhaustive.

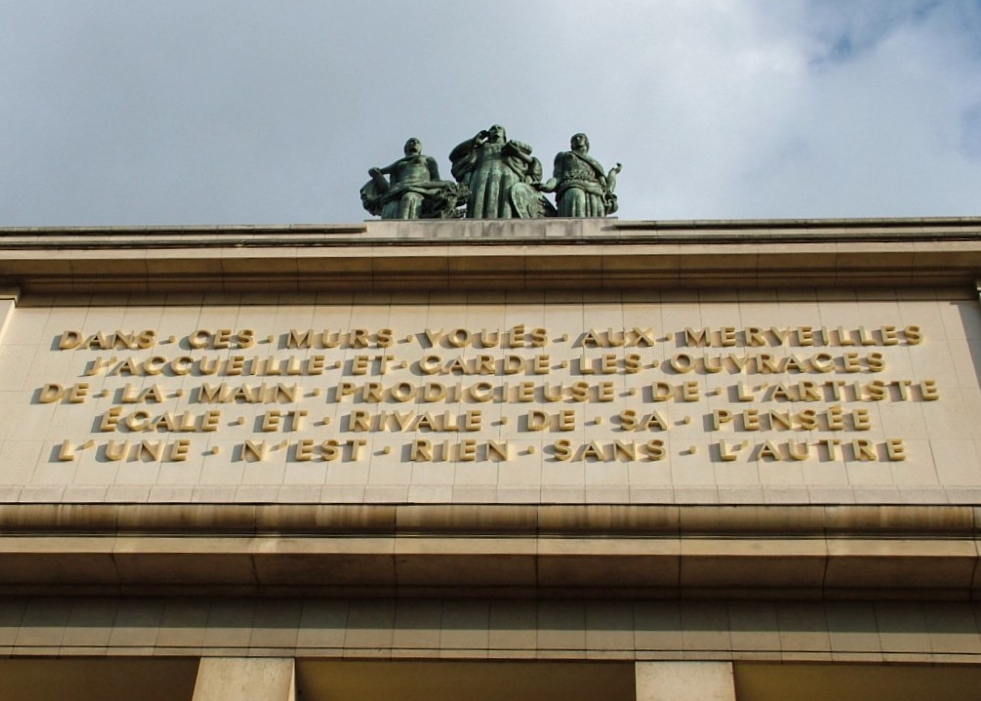
Motto on the pediment of the Musée de l'Homme: Dans ces murs voués aux merveilles J'accueille et garde les ouvrages De la main prodigieuse de l'artiste Égale et rivale de sa pensée. L'une n'est rien sans l'autre. Paul Valéry Within these walls devoted to wonders / I welcome and preserve the works / From the prodigious hand of the artist, / Equal to and rival of his thought. / One is nothing without the other.

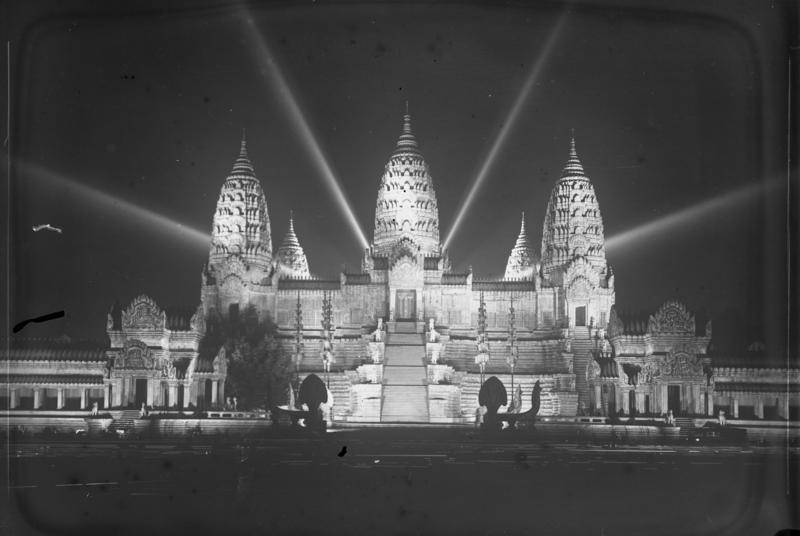
Replica of the Cambodian temple at Angkor Wat at the Paris Colonial Exhibition (1931)

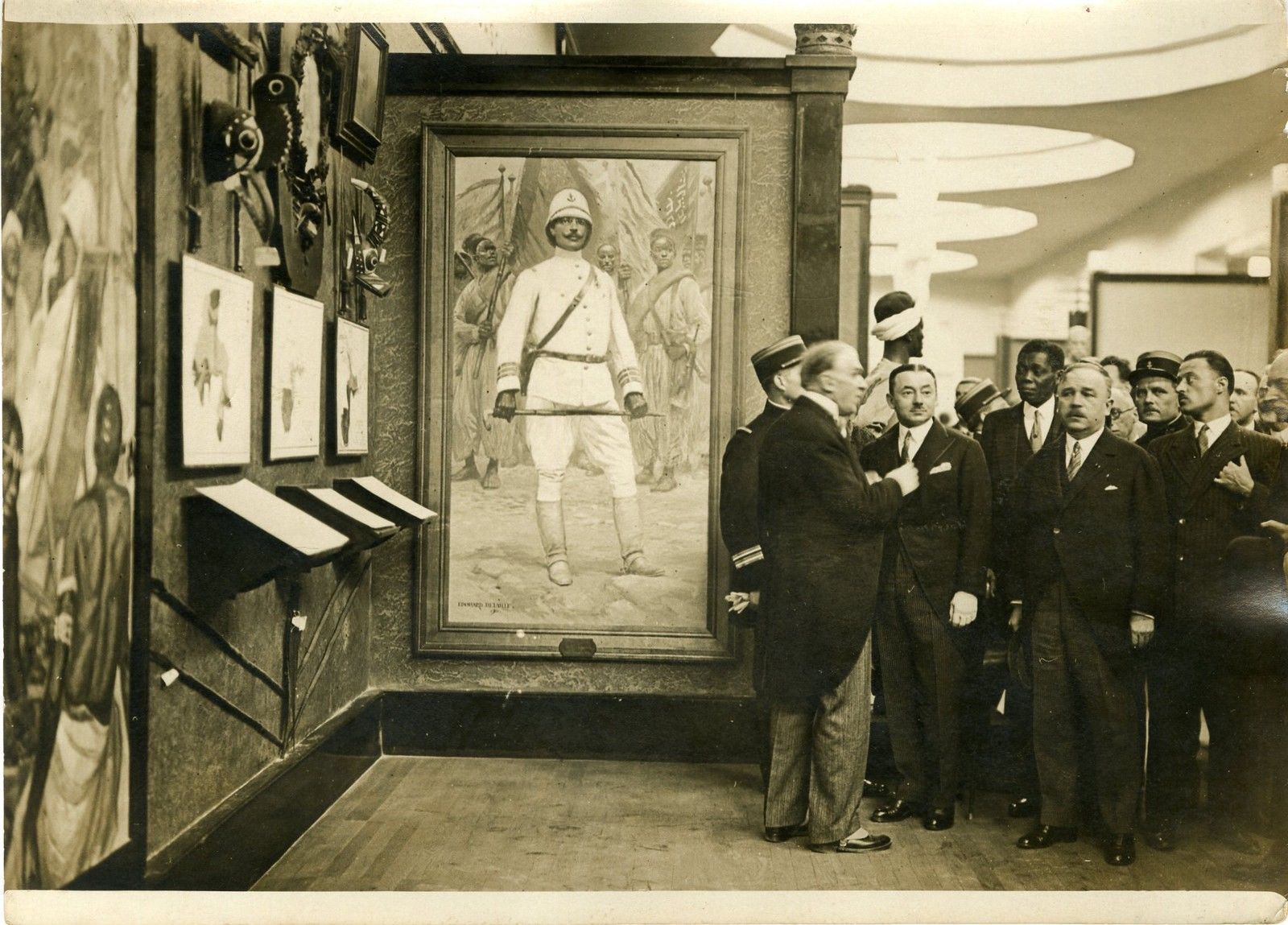
Inauguration of the Musée des colonies during the Paris Colonial Exposition

== A ==
- Abhandlungen aus dem Gebiet der Auslandskunde (Fortsetzung der Abhandlungen des Hamburgischen Kolonialinstituts), Hamburgische Universität

Vols. 10 and 16 of the complete Abhandlungen; these correspond to: Reihe B (Völkerkunde, Kulturgeschichte und Sprachen) vols. 6 and 9 (Wirz: 1922 and 1925)

- Acta societatis scientiarum fennicae

1917 XLVII (Landtman)

- Adair, J.

History of the American Indians. 1775.

- Adam, Leonhard

Stammesorganisation und Häuptlingstum der Wakash-Stämme, Zeitschrift für Vergleichende Rechtswissenschaft 1918 XXXV

- Andrian, F. v.

Die Siebenzahl im Geistesleben der Völker. Mitteilungen der Antropologischen Gesellschaft in Wien 1901.

- Africa

IV (Rattray) 1933
VIII (Blohm) (Hoffmann)
IX (Maes)
X (Kenyatta) 1937

- American Anthropological Association, Memoirs of the

Speck

- American Anthropologist

1934 XXXVI (Hallowell) (Klineberg)

- American Folklore Society, Memoirs
- American Museum of Natural History, Anthropological Papers

1914 IX (Skinner)
XIII (Skinner)
American Museum of Natural History, Bulletin (1901) (Dixon)

- American Philosophical Society, Memoirs of
- Andersson, C. J.

The lion and the elephant

- Angulo, Dr. Jaime de

1928 La Psychologie religieuse des Achumawi, Anthropos XXIII

- Annaes do XX Congresso Internacional de Americanistas (Denmore)
- Annalen en Almanak v. h. Missiehuis de Tilboerg (Art. Vertenten)
- Année sociologique

X (Hertz)

- Annual Report. Papua, 1905, 1911, 1913.
- Anthropos

1910 V (Pilsudski)
1928 XXIII (Angulo)
1931 XXVI (Tattevin) (Daigre)
1933 XXVIII (Meyer)
1936 XXXI (Labreque) (Van de Kamminade)

- Anthropologie

1934 XLIV (Saint-Périer)

- Archiv für Anthropologie

1915 XV (Irle)

- Archivio per l'antropologia, XXXII * (Società Italiana di Antropologia e Etnologia)
- Arriaga

Extirpation de la idolatria (1621)

- Australian Association for the Advancement of Science

Report of the 16th meeting (Spencer)

- Aymonier, É.

Voyage dans le Laos. Annales du Musée Guimet. 1895. V. 5. * **

== B ==
- Baessler-Archiv

I (Spiess)
II (Girschner)

- Bancroft, H.

The Native Races of the Pacifie States of North America. N.Y., 1875–1876. V. 1–5. Digital copy I

- Bantu Studies

1931 V (Bleek)
1933 VII (Bleek)

- Basden, G. T.

Among the Ibos of Nigeria. 1921. Digital copy

- Batchelor, J.

1901 The Aino and their folklore
Ainu life and lore

- Baumann, O.

Usambara und Nachbargebiete. Berlin, 1892.

- Beaver, W. N.

Unexplored New-Guinea. London, 1920. Digital copy

- Begouen, Le Comte and Breuil, Abbe H.

1934 De quelques figures hybrides (mi-humaines et mi-animales) de la caverne des Trois-Frères (Ariège), Revue anthropologique XLVI

- Benedict, Ruth

Tales of the Cochiti Indians, Bureau of American Ethnology, Bulletin n°98

- Bennett, A.

Ethnological Notes on the Fang. JAI. 1899. V. 29.

- Benthley, W. H.

Pioneering on the Congo. London 1900. Digital copy
The life and labours of a Congo pioneer. London 1887. Digital copy

- Bergaigne, A.

La religion Vedique d'apres les hymnes du Rig-Veda. Paris 1878–1897. V. 1–4.

- Bernau, J. H.

Missionary labours in British Guiana. London 1847. Digital copy

- Berthoud, H.

Weitere Thonga-Märchen, Zeitschrift für Eingeborenen-Sprachen, XXI

- Bertrand
- Best, Elsdon
- Maori Medical Lore. Journal of the Polinesian Society. 1904. V. 13.
- Maori nomenclature. JAI. 1902. V. 32.
- The Maori. Wellington (N. Zeeland), 1924. V. I.
- Bijdragen tot de taal-, land- en volkenkunde van Nederlandsch-Indië

1920 LXXVI (Kruyt)
1923 LXXIX (Kruyt)
1924 LXIII (Mallinckrodt)
1923 LXXX (Kruyt)

- Beveridge, P.

The Aborigines… of the Lower Murray. Journal and Proceedings of the Royal Society of New South Wales. 1884. V. 17.

- Birket-Smith, Kaj

The Eskimos

- Bittremieux, L.

Mayombsch Idioticon

- Bleek, D. F. (Hrsg.)

1931 Beliefs and customs of the !Xam Bushmen, from material collected by W. H. J. Bleek and Miss L. C. Lloyd between 1870 and 1880, Bantu Studies V.
1933 dto in Bantu Studies VII

- W. H. J. Bleek and Miss L. C. Lloyd

Specimens of Bushman folklore. London 1911.

- Blohm, W.

Xhosa-Texte, Baziya. Africa

- Boas, Franz

Tsimshian mythology. 31. Annual Report of the Bureau of American Ethnology 1909-1910, Washington 1916, 29ff.
Report XXXI
1890 N. W. Canadian tribes. Report of the British Association for the Advancement of Science
Eskimo of Baffinland and Hudson Bay. Bulletin of the American Museum of Natural History. 1907. V. XV.
First general report on the Indian of British Columbia. Baas for 1888, 1889. V. 59. P. 801–893.
Second general report on the Indians of British Columbia. Baas for 1890, 1891. V. 60. P. 562–715.
The Indians of the lower Fraser river. Baas for 1894. V. 64. P. 454–463.
The social organization of the Haida. Baas for 1898, 1899. V. 68. P. 648–683.

- Bock, C.

The head-hunters of Borneo. Digital copy

- Bösch, Fr.

1930 Les Banyamwesi
Le Culte des ancêtres chez les Banyangwezi. Anthropos. 1925. XX.

- Bogoras, Wl.

The Chukchee. London 1904–1909.

- Bollig, L. (O. M. Cap)

Die Bewohner der Truk-Inseln.

- Bonney, F.

On some customs of the aborigines of the river Darling (New South Wales). JAI. 1883–1884. V. XIII, 2.

- Bosman, W.

Voyage de Guinee. 14 lettres. Utrecht, 1705.

- Bourlet, A.

Les Thay (Laos). Anthropos. 1907. II.

- Bowdich, T. E.

Mission from Cape Coast Castle to Ashantee. London 1819.

- Breuil, H. - Obermaier, H.

1935 The Cave of Altamira at Santillana del Mar (Spain) Madrid

- Bridges, W.

A Few Notes on the Structure of Yaghan. JAI. 1893. V. 23–24. P. 53–80.

- Brincker, H.

Wörterbuch der Otji-Herero

- Brincker, P. H.

Charakter und Sitten der Bantu S. W. Afrikas. Mitteilungen des Seminars für orientalische Sprachen. 1900. III. 3.

British Association for the Advancement of Science, Reports of the
(Boas)

- Brett, W.

The Indian tribes of Guiana. London 1868. Digital copy

- Bröndal
- Brook, Ch.

Ten Years in Sarawak. L., 1848. V. 1–2.

- Brough Smith, R.

The aborigines of Victoria (I, II)

- Brown, G.

Melanesians and Polynesians. London 1910 - Digital copy

- Brown, J.

Among the Bantu nomads. London 1926.

- Brownlie, W. T.

Witchcraft among the natives of South Africa. Journal of the African Society. 1926. N. XXV.

- Brun

Note sur les croyances des Malinkés (Côte occidentale française). Anthropos. 1925. II.

- Brutzer

Der Geisterglaube bei den Kamba. 1905.

- Bryant, A. T.

A Zulu-English dictionary

- Buckland, A. W.

Four as sacred number. JAI. 1895–1896. V. 25.

- Bulletin de la Société française de philosophie 1923 23e annee
- Bulletin of the American Museum of Natural History

1901 (Dixon)

- Bullock, Ch.

The Mashona

- Christoph Bunk (missionaire)
- Bureau of American Ethnology, Bulletin

VIII (Dorsey)
XI (Dorsey)
XVIII (Nelson)
XIX (Mooney)
1904 XXIII (Stevenson)
XXXI (Boas)
1930 XLV (Teit)
1932 n°94 (Harrington)
n°98 (Benedict)
n°99 (Mooney and Olbrechts)
1937 CXV (Kurz)

- Bureau of Ethnography of the Smithsonian Institution
- Butterworth, G. Rev.

Letter… Wesleyan Missionary Notices. 1851. V. 9.

== C ==
- Caillet, Em.

1936 Symbolisme et âmes primitives

- Callaway, Canon Henry

Nursery tales, Traditions, and Histories of the Zulus. Natal and London 1868
The Religious System of the Amazulu, Natal. 1868–1870.

- Cambridge Expedition to Torres Straits, Reports of the
- Cameron. Rev. Letter... Wesleyan Missionary Notices. 1848. V. 6.
- Campana, Domenico del

1902 Notizie intorno ai Ciriguani. Archivio per l'antropologia, XXXII Digital copy

- Canadian Arctic expedition, Report of the
- Cardinall, A. W.

Tales told in Togoland

- Cartailhac, Ém. and Breuil, H.

La caverne d'Altamira à Santillane, près Santander (Espagne). Monaco 1906

- Casalis, E.

Les Bassoutos ou 23 annees de sejour et d'observations au sud de l'Afrique. Paris 1859.

Cassirer, E.
Philosophie der symbolischen Formen

- Catlin, G.

The North American Indians. Edinburgh, 1903.

- Cavacci, G. A.

Istorica descrizione de'tre regni di Congo, Matamda ed Angola: Milan, 1690. Digital copy

- Census of India, Extracts from...
- Chadwick, N.
- Chaillu, P. du

The country of the dwarfs - Digital copy
Explorations and adventure in Equatorial Africa. London, 1861.

- Chalmers, J.

Maipua and Namau Numerals. JAI. 1897–1898. V. 27.

- Chamberlain, B. H.

Things Japanese. 1902.

- Charlevoix, P.

Histoire et description générale de la Nouvelle France. Paris, 1744. V. 1–3.

- Chatelain, Héli

Folktales of Angola - Digital copy

- Chinnery, E. W. F.

Notes on the natives of E. Mira and St. Matthias. Territory of New-Guinea. Anthropological Report, II

- Codrington, R. H.

The Melanesians, Oxford, 1891.
The Melanesian Languages. Oxford, 1885.

- Compayre, G.

L'évolution intellectuelle et morale de l'enfant Digital copy

- Comte, A.

Cours de philosophie positive. Paris 1830–1842. V. 1–6.

- Conant, Levi L.

The Number concept, its origins and development. N.Y.; L., 1896. *

- Congo

1930 III (Van Wing)

- Cousinet, R.

1937 La fabulation chez les enfants. Journal de psychologie, XXXIV

- Crooke, W.

The popular religion and folk-lore of Northern India. Westminster, 1896. V. 1–2.

- Culin, S.

Games of the North American Indians. E. B. Rep. 1907. V. 24. - Digital copy

- Cummins, S. L.

Sub-tribes of the Bahr-el-Ghazal Dinkas. JAI. 1904, V. 34.

- Cuny, A.

Le nombre duel en grec. Paris 1906 - Digital copy

- Cushing, F.

Manual Concepts. American Anthropologist. 1892. V. 5.
Outlines of Zuni creation myths. E. B. Rep. 1896. V. 13.

== D ==
- Daigre, R. P.

Les Bandas de l'Oubangui-Chari, in: Anthropos Bd. 26 (1931)

- Dapper, O.

Description de l'Afrique. Amsterdam, 1686.

- Deacon, A. B.

Malekula

- Dale, G.

An Account of the Principal Customs and Habits of the Natives Inhabiting the Bondei Country. JAI. 1896. V. 25.

- Deane, W.

Fijian Society. London 1921.

- Degrandpré, L. M.

Voyage à la côte occidentale d'Afrique, fait dans les années 1786 et 1787. Paris 1801. V. 1–2. digital copy

- Densmore, Frances

Rhythm in the music of the American Indian. Annaes do XX Congreso Internacional de Americanistas, I

- Dennet, R. E.

At the back of the black man's mind. London 1906.

- Deschamps, Hubert

1936 Le dialecte antaisaka.

- Dieterlen, H.

La médecine et les médecins au Lessouto. Paris, Société des Missions Évangéliques (1930), Les Cahiers missionnaires, n° 17.

- Dixon, R. B.

1901 The Shasta. Bulletin of the American Museum of Natural History, XVII

- Dobrizhoffer, M.

An account of the Abipones. London 1822. V. 1–2.

- Doehne, J. L.

A Zulu-English Dictionary. 1857.

- Doke, C. M.

1932 The Lambas of northern Rhodesia

- Donner, Kai

1926 Bei den Samojeden in Sibirien

- Dorsey, Geo. A.

1904 Traditions of the Skidi Pawnee. Boston and New York.

- Dorsey, J. O.

1894 A study of Siouan cults. Bureau of American Ethnology, Report XI.

- Driberg, J. H.

1936 The secular aspect of ancestor-worship in Africa. Supplement to the Journal of the Royal African Society, XXXV
The Lango. London 1923.
Didinga customary law. Sudan Notes and Records. 1927. VIII.

- Duarte, В.

A Description of the Coast of East Africa and Malabar in the Beginning of the XVI Century. Hakluyt Society. 1866. V. 35.

- Du Bois, Cora

1935 Wintu ethnography. University of California Publication in American Archaeology and Ethnology Volume 35 No. 1

- Dugast

Leopard-men

- Duhamel
- Dunn, E.

The Religious Rites and Customs of the Iban or Dyaks of Sarawak. Anthropos. 1906. V. 1.

- Dumarest, N.

1919 Notes on Cochiti, New Mexico, Memoirs of the American Anthropological Association, VI

- Dumont D'Urville, M. J.

Voyage de la corvette l'Astrolabe. Histoire du voyage. Paris 1830–1834. V. 1–5. Digital copy

- Dundas, Ch.

Kilimanjaro and Its People: A History of Wachagga, their Laws, Customs and Legends. London 1924.

- Durkheim

Formes élémentaires de la vie religieuse
Examen critique des systemes classiques sur l'origine de la pensée religieuse. Revue philosophique. 1909. N. 1–2.

- Durkheim, E., Mauss, M.

Des quelques formes primitives de classification. Année sociologique. 1903. V. 6.

== E ==
- Edelfelt, E. G.

Customs and superstitions of New Guinea natives. Proceedings of the Queensland branch of the Royal Geographical Society of Australia. 1891. V. VII. Part 1.

- Ehrenreich, P.

Die Mythen und Legenden der Südamerikanischen Urvölker und ihre Beziehungen zu denen Nordamerikas und der alten Welt. Zeitschrift für Ethnologie. 1905. Bd. 37. Supplement. - Digital copy

- Beiträge zur Völkerkunde Brasiliens. Veröffentlichungen aus dem Königlichen Museum für Völkerkunde - Digital copy
- Elliot, H. M., Beames, J.

Memoirs on the History, Folk-lore and Distribution of the Races of the North Western Provinces of India. London, 1869. V. 1–2.

- Elkin, A.P.

1930 Rock-paintings of N. W. Australia, Oceania I
Social organization in the Kimberley division. Oceania, II
1932 The secret life of Australian aborigines, Oceania III
1933 Studies in Australian Totemism, Oceania IV
1933 Totemism in N. W. Australia, Oceania III
1935 Civilised aborigines and native culture. Oceania, VI

- Ellis, A.B.

The Ewe-speaking peoples of the slave coast of West Africa : their religion, manners, customs, laws, languages. London 1890
The Yoruba-speaking peoples. London 1894.
The Tshi-speaking peoples. London 1887.

- Endemann, K.

Wörterbuch der Sotho-Sprache. Hamburg, 1911.

- Essays presented to C. G. Seligman

1934 (Landtman)

- Evan, A.

Documents du Musée du Congo Belge. Dossier ethnographique n° 798. Tervueren, citee par J. Maes

- Evangelisches Missions-Magazin. 1913.
- Evans, I. H. W.

Studies in Religion, Folk-Lore, Custom in British North Borneo and the Malay Peninsula. Cambridge, 1923.

- Evans-Pritchard, E. E.

1937 Witchcraft, oracles and magic among the Azande
The Zande corporation of witch-doctors.JRAI,LXIII
1934 Lévy-Bruhl's Theory of Primitive Mentality, Bulletin of the Faculty of Arts, Egyptian University (Cairo), II, 1934
1965 Theories of Primitive Religion
Extracts from the Census Report on the Andaman and Nicobar islands. Census of India, 1931.I (III,b) see Hutton,J.H.(Hrsg.) Delhi 1933

- Eylmann, E.

Die Eingeborenen der Kolonie Südaustralien. Berlin, 1908.

- Eyre, E. J.

Journals of expeditions of discovery into Central Australia. London 1845. V. 1–2.

- d'Évreux, Y.

Voyage dans le nord du Brésil fait durant les années 1613 et 1614.

== F ==
- Fewkes, J. W.

Tusayan flute and snake ceremonies. E. B. Rep. 1897. V. 16. Digital copy

- Firth, R.

1930 Totemism in Polynesia, Oceania I
1932 Anthropology in Australia 1926-1932 and after, Oceania III

- Fischer, G. A.

Bericht über die Reise in das Massai-Land. Mitteilungen der Geographischen Gesellschaft in Hamburg. 1882–1883.

- Fison and Howitt

cited in Elkin 1933
The Nanga, or Sacred Stone Enclosure of Wainimala, Fiji. JAI. 1885. V. 14.

- Fitz-Roy, R.

Proceedings of the second expedition 1831–1836. London, 1839.

- Fletscher, A.

The Signification of the Scalp-lock (Omaha ritual). JAI. 1897–1898. V. 27.

- Fontenelle
- Forde, C. D.

Ethnology of the Yuma Indians. Publications of the University of California Press. Anthropological series, XXVIII

- Fortune, R. F.

Sorcerers of Dobu. N. Y., 1932
1937 Manus Religion, Memoirs of the American Philosophical Society, III

- Fox, C. E.

The threshold of the Pacific
Social Organisation in San Chritoval. JAI. 1919. V. 49.

- Fraser, J.

Some Remarks on the Australian Languages. Journal and Proceedings of the Royal Society of N. S. Wales. 1890.

- Frazer, J.G.

Aftermath
Certain Burial Customs as Illustrative of the Primitive Theory of the Soul. JAI. 1886. V. 16.
Golden Bough. London 1903. V. 1–3.
Men's Language and Women's Language. Fortnightly Review. 1900. V. 1.

- Fritsch, G.

Die Eingeborenen Süd-Afrikas. Breslau, 1872.

- Frobenius, L.

(1931) Das unbekannte Afrika, in: Journal of the South-West Africa Scientific Society V

- Fülleborn, Fr.

Das deutsche Njassa- und Ruwuma-Gebiet, Land und Leute, nebst Bemerkungen über die Schire-Länder. Berlin, 1906 (in Deutsch-Ost-Afrika. Bd. 9).

== G ==
- Gaden, H.

Proverbes et maximes Peuls et Toucouleurs. Travaux et mémoires de l'Institut d'ethnologie, XVI

- Gallatin, A.

Transactions of the American Ethnological Society. 1845. V. 2.

- Gason, S.

The manners, and customs of the Dieyerie tribe of Australian aborigines (Wood. The native tribes of South Australia. Adelaide. 1879. P. 253–307).
On the Tribes Dieyerie, Auminie etc. JAI. 1894–1895. V. 24. P. 167–176.

- Gatschet, A.

The Klamath Indians of Southwestern Oregon. Washington, 1898. V. 1–2. (Contributions to North American Ethnology. V. 2).

- General series in anthropology II, Menesha, Wisconsin (Parsons)
- Glave, E. J.

Six Years of Adventure in Congo Land. London 1893.

- Goeje, C. H.

1932 Oudheden uit Suriname, of zoek naar der Amazonen, West-Indische Gids, XIII

- Gifford, E. W.

1926 Yuma dreams and omens, Journal of American Folklore XXXIX

- Gillen, see Spencer
- Girschner, M.

Die Karolineninsel Namoluk und ihre Bewohner. Baessler-Archiv, II

- Goethe
- Gordon, E. M.

People of Mungeli Tahsil, Bilaspur District. Journal of the Asiatic Society of Bengal. 1902. V. 3.

- Graebner

Das Weltbild der Primitiven

- Grévisse, F.

1937 Les Bayeke. Bulletin des juridictions indigènes et du droit coutumier congolais, V

- Grey, G.

1841 Journals of two expeditions of discovery in North-West and Western Australia during the years 1837,38 and 39

- Groves, W. C.

1934 Fishing rites at Tabar. Oceania, IV

- Goddard, P. E.
- Gottschling, E.

The Bawenda. JAI. 1905. V. 35.

- Goudswaard, A.

De Papoewa's van de Geelsvincks baai. 1863.

- Graebner

Das Weltbild des Primitiven. München, 1924.

- Granville, Roth F.

Notes on the Sekris, Sobos and Ijos of the Warri District of the Niger Coast Protectorate. 1889. JAI. V. XXVIII.

- Gray W.

Notes on the Natives of Tanna. JAI. 1898–1899. V. 28.

- Grey, G.

Journal of two expeditions of discovery in North-Western Australia. L., 1841. V. 1–2.

- Grierson, G. A.

Tibeto-Burman Languages. Linguistic Survey of India. V. 3. - Digital copy

- Groot, J. de

Le code de Mahayana en China. Amsterdam, 1894.
The religious system of China. Leiden, 1892–1910. V. l — 6.

- Grove, E. T. N.

Customs of the Acholi. Sudan Notes and Records. 1919. II. 3.

- Grubb, W.B.

An unknown people in an unknown land (Lengua). London 1911 - Digital copy

- Guevara, T.

Folklore araucano. Madrid, 1911
Psicologia del pueblo araucano

- Guise, R. E.

On the Tribes Inhabiting the Mouth of the Wanigela River, New-Gunea. JAI. 1898–1899. V. 28.

- Gutmann, B.

Feldbausitten und Wachstumsgebräuche der Wadschagga. Zeitschrift für Ethnologie. 1913. XLV.
Archiv für die gesamte Psychologie. XLVIII.

== H ==
- Haddon, A. C.

The Western Tribes of Torres Straits. JAI. 1890. V. 19.

- Hagen, B.

Unter den Papuas. Wiesbaden, 1899.

- Hagen, G.

Die Bana. Baessler-Archiv. 1912. Bd. 2.

- Hahn, Th.

Tsuni-Goam, the supreme Being of the Khoi-Khoi. London 1881.

- Hallowell, A. I.

Some empirical aspects of Northern Saulteaux religion. American Anthropologist, XXXVI 1934

- Hansen, J. K. K.

De groep Noord- en Zuid-Pageh van de Mentawei-eilanden. T. L. V. 1914.

- Hardeland, A.

1859 Dajacksch-deutsches Wörterbuch

- Harrington, J. P.

1932 Tabacco among the Karuk Indians of California, Bureau of American Ethnology, Bulletin, n°94 Digital copy
A Yuma account of origins. Journal of American Folklore, XXI

- Hatch, W. J.

The land pirates of India. London 1929.

- Hawker, G.

The life of George Grenfell: Congo missionary and explorer. 1909.

- Hawtrey

The Lengua Indians of the Paraguayan Chaco. JAI. 1901. V. 31.

- Hennepin, L.

Voyage ou nouvelle découverte d'un très grand pays dans l'Amérique, entre le Nouveau Mexique et la mer glaciale. Amsterdam, 1704.

- Henry, A.

The Lolos and Other Tribes of West China. JAI. 1903. V. 33.

- Henry, V.

Esquisse d'une grammaire raisonnée de la langue aléoute. 1879. Digital copy

- Le Hérissé, A.

L'ancien royaume du Dahomey. Moeurs, religions, histoire. Paris, 1910.

- Hertz, R.

Contribution à une étude sur la représentation collective de la mort. Année sociologique. 1905–1906. V. X.

- Hetherwick

Some animistic belief of the Yaos. JAI. 1902. V. 32.

- Hewitt, J. N.

Iroquoian cosmology. E. B. Rep. 1903. V. 21.

- Hill, W. W.

Navaho warfare. Yale University Publications in anthropology, V (1936)

- Hobley, C. W.

1922 Bantu beliefs and magic
1926 Ethnology of the Akamba and other East African tribes
Further Researches into Kikuyu and Karba Religious Beliefs. JAI. 1911. V. 41.
British East Africa. Antiopological Studies in Kavirond and Nandi. JAI. 1903. V. 33.

- Hoffmann, C.

Betshabelo. Africa VIII

- Hoffman, W. J.

The Menomini Indians. E. B. Rep. 1896. V. 14.

- Hogbin, H. Ian

1936 Mana. Oceania, VI

- Holub, E.

Sieben Jahre in Südafrika. Wien, 1881. II.

- Homer, Joe
- Horne, G., Aiston G.

Savage life in Australia. London, 1924.

- Hose and Mac Dougall

1901 The relations between men and animals in Sarawak, Journal of the Anthropological Institute, xxxi. (1901)
Pagan tribes of Borneo

- Howitt, A. W.

The Native Tribes of South-Australia. London 1904
On Australian Medicinemen. JAI. 1887. V. 16.
Notes on Australian Message Sticks and Messengers. JAI. 1889. V. 18.

- Hubert, H. and Mauss, M.

1905 Étude sommaire de la représentation du temps dans la religion et la magie. Mélanges d'histoire des religions Digital copy
Esquisse d'une theorie generale de la magie. Année sociologique. 1904. V. 7. P. 1–147.

- Huc and Gabet

Souvenirs d'un voyage dans Tartarie, le Thibet et la Chine

- Hunt, A.

Ethnographical Notes on the Murray Islands, Torres Straits. JAI. 1890–1899. V. 28.

- Hunter, Monica

1936 Reaction to conquest

- Hurel, E.

Religion et vie domestique des Bakerewe. Anthropos. 1911. V. 6.

- Hutereau, A.

Notes sur la vie familiale et juridique de quelques populations du Congo Belge. Bruxelles, 1909.

- Hutton, J. H.

1933 Report on the Census of India, 1931 (Vol.I of the Census of India, 1931) Delhi
The Angami Nagas. London 1921.

== I ==
- Im Thurn, Everard F.

1883 Among the Indians of Guiana. London

- Institut d'ethnologie, Travaux et memoires de

1915 XXII (Vertenten) (Te Wechel)

- Internationales Archiv für Ethnographie 1915
- Irle, J.

1915 Die Religion der Herero, Archiv für Anthropologie, N. F. 1915. XV.

- Ivens, W. G.

Melanesians of the South-east Solomon Islands

== J ==
- Jackson, H. C.

Seed-time and harvest. Sudan Notes and Records. 1919. 11, I.

- Jacottet, E.

Études sur les langues du Haut-Zambèze. Paris 1896–1901. V. 1–3. Digital copye
On the Superstitions of the Ten'a. Anthropos. 1911. V. 6.

- JAI — Journal of the Royal Anthropological Institute of Great Britain and Ireland (London).

Last Notes on the Languages Spoken in Madagascar. JAI. 1896. V. 25.

- Jastrow, M.

The Religion of Babylonia and Assyria. Boston, 1898. Handbooks of the History of Religions. V. 2.

- Java-Post (Art. Vertenten)
- Jeanneret

Les Maca. Bulletin de la Société neuchâteloise de géographie. 1895. V. 8.

- Jellinghaus, Th.

Sagen, Sitten und Gebräuche der Munda-Kohls in Chota Nagpore. Zeitschrift für Ethnologie, 1871.

- Jenks, A. E.

The Bontoc Igorot. Ethnological Survey Publication. 1905. (Manila). V. 1.

- Jenness, D.

Myths and traditions from northern Alaska, the Mackenzie Delta, and Coronation Gulf. Report of the Canadian arctic Expedition, 1913-1918, XIII, Eskimo folklore
The life of the Copper Eskimo. The Canadian Arctic Expedition. 1913–1918. XII.

- Jesuit Relations and allied documents

Ed. by K. G. Thwaites. Cleveland, 1896–1901. V. l — 73.
The Jesuit Relations / Ed. Thwaites. Nouvelle France. 1672–1673. V. LVIII.

- Jette, J.

On the Superstitions of the Ten'a Indians. Anthropos. 1911. V. 6.
On the Medicine Men of the Ten'a. JAI. 1907. V. 37.

- Jewitt, J.

A narrative of the adventures and sufferings… among the savages of Nootka Sound. N.Y., 1849.

- Jochelson, W.

The Koryak. 1905–1908.

- Jones, G. H.

The spirit worship in Korea. Transactions of the Korea Branch of the Royal Asiatic Society. V. II. Part 1.

- Journal de la Société des américanistes N.S., XXVII (Métraux)
- Journal de psychologie

1937 XXXIV (Cousinet)

- Journal des Africanistes

1936 VI (Trezenem)

- Journal des Americanistes

1932 N.S. XXIV (Nordenskiöld)

- Journal of American Folklore

1889 II (Rink and Boas)
1891 IV (Packard)
XXI (Harrington)
1926 XXXIX (Gifford)

- Journal of the Royal African Society

1927/8 XXVII (Wilson-Haffenden)
1936 XXXV Supplement (Driberg)

- Journal of the Royal Anthropological Institute JRAI

XXXIV (Roscoe)
1913 XLIII (Radcliffe-Brown)
LXIII (Thompson, Donald F.) (Evans-Pritchard)

- Journal of the South-West Africa scientific society

V (1931) Frobenius

- Junod, H. A.

Grammaire ronga. Lausanne, 1883.
Les Ba-Ronga. Bulletin de la Société neuchâteloise de géographie 1898 (Neuchâtel). N. l.
The Life of South African Tribe. Neuchatel, 1912-1913. V. 1–2. Digital copy I, II

== K ==
- Kaberry, Phyllis M.

1935 Death and deferred mourning ceremonies in the Forrest river tribes, N. W. Australia. Oceania, VI

- Karsten, R.

Contributions to the sociology of the Indian tribes of Ecuador
The Toba Indians of the Bolivian Gran Chaco. Acta Academiae Aboensis humaniora. 1915. IV.

- Keane, A.

The Lapps, their Origin etc. JAI. 1885. V. 14.

- C. Tennant Kelly

Tribes of Cherburg settlement Queensland. Oceania. V (1935)

- Kenyatta, Jomo

1937 Kikuyu religion, ancestor-worship, and sacrifial practices. Africa, X

- Keysser, Christian

1911 Aus dem Leben der Kaileute (in: Neuhauss III)

- Kimmenade, R. P. Martin van de

Les Sandawe. Anthropos XXXI

- Kingsley, M.

West-African Studies. L., 1899.

- Kitching, A. L.

On the backwaters of the Nile. 1912.

- Kleiweg de Zwaan

1913 Die Heilkunde der Niasser

- Klineberg, Otto

1934 Notes on the Huichol. American Anthropologist XXXVI

- Koch-Grünberg, Theodor

Zwei Jahre unter den Indianern
Vom Roroima zum Orinoco

- Kohl, J.

Kitchi- Garni, or Lake Superior. London, 1861. Digital copy

- Kootz-Kretschmer, E.

Die Safwa. Berlin, 1929.

- Kponton, H.

Etude sur la tribu des Lambas (inédit... G.-P. Thébault)

- Kroeber

Handbook of the Indians of California (digitized copy)

- Kropf, A.

Kaffir-English Dictionary. Lovedale, 1899.
Das Volk der Xosa-Kaffern. Berlin, 1889.

- Kruyt, A. C.

Het Animisme in dem Indischen Archipel. ’s-Gravenhage, 1906 Digital copy
Measa, I, II, III. Bijdragen tot... (1918, 1919, 1920)
De Timoreezen, Bijdragen tot de taal-, land- en volkenkunde van Nederlandsch-Indië 1923 . LXXIX
1924 De Moriërs van Tinompo, (oostelijk Midden-Celebes). Bijdragen tot de taal-, land- en volkenkunde van Nederlandsch-Indië
1937 De hond in de geestenwereld der Indonesiërs. Tijdschrift voor Indische Taal-, Land- en Volkenkunde, LXXII
De Bare Sprekende Toradja's. II.

- Kubary, J.

Die Ebongruppe im Marshall's Archipel. Museum Godeffroy, 1873 (Hamburg). Teil I.

- Kuhlmann (Omaruru)

Article series in the Windhuker Zeitung from 1927, see Lebzelter

- Kurz, R. F.

1937 Journal (1846-52). BAE. Bulletin CXV

== L ==
- Labreque, Ed.

1936 La tribu des Babemba. Anthropos XXXI

- Lagae, C. R. and van den Plas, V. H.

La langue des Azande, III

- Lagae C. R., О. Р.

Les Azande ou Niam-Niam.

- Landtman, G.

1917 Folktales of the Kiwai Papuans, Acta societatis scientiarum fennicae XLVII. Helsingfors
1927 The Kiwai Papuans of British New Guinea. London
1933 Ethnographical collection from the Kiwai district of British New-Guinea (Helsingfors 1933)
1934 The origins of sacrifice as illustrated by a primitive, in: Essays presented to C. G. Seligman

- Lang, A.

Mythology. Encyclopaedia Britannica. V. 17. 9-th edition

- Latcham, R. E.

Ethnology of the Araucanos. JAI. 1909. V. 39.

- Layard, J.

1934 The Journey of the Dead from the Small Islands of North-Eastern Malekula. Essays presented to C. G. Seligman

- Lebzelter, V.

Eingeborenenkulturen in Süd-West- und Süd-Afrika. 1934

- Le Clerq
- Nouvelle Relation de la Gaspésie.
- Leenhardt, M.

1930 Notes d'ethnologie néo-calédonienne, Travaux et mémoires de l'Institut d'ethnologie, VIII
1932 Documents néo-calédoniens, Travaux... IX
1938 Gens de la Terre
Dictionnaire de la langue houaïlou

- Le Hérissé

L'ancien royaume du Dahomey

- Leichhardt, Ludwig

Journal of an overland expedition in Australia from Moreton Bay to Port Essington, a distance upwards of 3000 miles, during the Years 18844-1845. London 1847

- Leonard, А. G.

The lower Niger and its tribes. 1906. Digital copy

- Leonhardi, Mor. von

Vorrede zu C. Strehlow, Die Aranda- und Loritja-Stämme in Zentral-Australien. 1910. Bd. III.

- Leroi-Gourhan, A.

1937 La zoologie mythique des Eskimo. La Terre et la Vie, VII Digital copy

- Leroy, Ch.

Lettres sur les animaux. London, 1896. Digital copy (1862)

- Letters from Victorian Pioneers

(Thomas)

- Lévy-Bruhl, L.

La Mentalité primitive. Paris 1922
Le Surnaturel et la nature dans la mentalité primitive
Les fonctions mentales dans les sociétés inferieures. Paris 1910
L'âme primitive

- Lewis, C. M.

1837 Voyage of the colonial schooner Isabella, in: Reports of the Cambridge Expedition to Torres Straits, I *

- Lichtenstein, H.

Reisen im südlichen Afrika in den Jahren 1803, 1804, 1805 und 1806.

- Lindblom, G.

1920 The Akamba

- Livingston, D.

1857 Missionary travels and researches in South Africa
1865 Zambesi and its tributaries

- Livingstone, D., Livingstone, Ch.

Narrative of an expedition to the Zambesi and its tributaries. London 1865. Digital copy

- Lloyd, L.G. (see Bleek)
- Loango-Expedition, see Eduard Pechuel-Loesche
- Loeb, E. M.

Mentawei Religious Cult. University of California Publications. V.XXV.
Porno folkways. University of California: Publications in American Archaeology and Ethnology. V. XIX.

- Lovett, R.

1908 James Chalmers. His autobiography and letters

- Low, Hugh

Sarawak, its inhabitants and productions. London, 1848 - Digital copy

- Lumholtz, C.

Symbolism of the Huichol Indians. Memoirs of American Museum of Natural History. 1900. V. 3.1 Anthropology. V. 2.
Unknown Mexico. London, 1903. V. 1–2.

== M ==
- Macdonald, J.

Manners, Customs, Superstitions, and Religions of South African Tribes. JAI. 1898–1890. V. 19, 20.

- Macdonald, D.

Africana. London, 1882.

- Mac-Gee, W. J.

Primitive Numbers. E. B. Rep. 1900. V. 19.

- MacKenzie, D. R.

The spirit-ridden Konde. 1925.

- Mackenzie, J.

Ten years north of the Orange River. Edinburgh, 1871. Digital copy

- MacConnel, Urs.

1930 The Wik-Munkan tribe, Oceania I
1935 Myth of the Wik-Munkan and Wik-Natara tribes. Oceania VI

- Mac Dougall, s. Hose
- Mackintosh, A.

Account of the tribes of Mhadeo-Kolies. Transactions of the Bombay Geographical Society. 1836.

- MacLean, Colonel

A Compendium of Kaffir laws and customs.

- Macpherson.

Memorials of service in India. London, 1865.

- Maes, J.

Mythes et légendes sur l'allume-feu des populations du Congo belge, in: Africa, 9 n°4, 1936, pp.495-507.

- Maldonado, A. & H. Valdizan

1922 La medicina popular peruana

- Malinowski, Br.

1918 Fishing in the Trobriand Islands, Man
1922 Argonauts of the western Pacific
1926 Myth in primitive psychology. London. New York
1934 The sexual life of savages in North-Western Melanesia. London 1934.

- Mallinckrodt, J.

1924 Ethnographische mededeelingen over de Dayaks in de afdeeling Koelakapoeas. Bijdragen tot de taal-, land- en volkenkunde van Nederlandsch-Indië, LXIII (1924)

- Man

1918 (Malinowski)

- Mangin, P. B.

Les Mossi. Anthropos. 1914. V. XI.

- Mann

On the Numeral System of the Yoruba Nation. JAI. 1887. V. 16.

- Mansfeld, A..

Urwald-Dokumente. Vier Jahre unter den Grossflussnegern Kameruns. Berlin, 1908.

- Marqueissac, H. de

1935 Une peuplade togolaise, les Cabrais. Togo-Cameroun

- Mauss, M.

in: Bulletin de la Societe francaise de philosophie, 23e annee, 1923

- Martius, C. F. P.

Beitrage zur Ethnographie und Sprachenkunde Amerikas zumal Brasiliens. Leipzig, 1867. Bd. 1–2.

- Mathews, R.

Language of Some Native Tribes. Journal and Proceedings of the R. Society of N. S. Wales. 1903.
Aboriginal Tribes of N. S. Wales and Victoria. Journal and Proceedings of the R. Society of N. S. Wales. 1905.
Languages of the Kamilaroi and Other Aboriginal Tribes of N. S. Wales. JAI. 1903. V. 33.
The Aboriginal Languages of Victoria. Journal and Proceedings of the R. Society of N. S. Wales. 1903.
The Burbong Initiation Ceremony. Journal and Proceedings of the Royal Society of N. S. Wales. 1898.

- Mattery, G.

Sign Language among North American Indians. E. B. Rep. 1881. V. 1.

- Meddelelser om Grönland

XL (Thalbitzer)

- Meek, C. K.

1935 Tribal studies in North Nigeria

- Meier, Jos.

1909 Mythen und Erzählungen der Küstenbewohner der Gazelle-Halbinsel (Neu-Pommern)

- Meillet, A.

Linguistique historique et linguistique generale, II
Introduction a l'étude comparative des langues indoeuropéennes. Paris, 1908.

- Meinhof, С.

Afrikanische Religionen. Berlin, 1912.

- Mélanges d'histoire des religions

(Hubert and Mauss)

- Memoirs of the American Anthropological Association

1919 VI (Speck)(Dumarest)

- Memoirs of the American Folklore Society

1898 VI (Teit)
1917 XI (Spinden)(Teit)

- Memoirs of the American philosophical society, III, 1937

(Fortune)

- Métraux, A.

Les Indiens Uro-Cipaya de Carangas. Journal de la Société des Americanistes. N.S., XXVII
La religion des tupinambo. Paris, 1928.

- Merensky, Alexander

Deutsche Arbeit am Nyassa
Erinnerungen aus dem Missionsleben in Südost-Afrika (Transvaal). 1859-1882. 1888.

- Metzger, H.

(Inhaltsverzeichnis)

- Meyer, Heinrich (S.V.D.)

1933 Wunekua, oder Sonnenverehrung in Neu Guinea, Anthropos, XXVIII

- Meyer, E.

Le Kirengo des Wachada, peuplade bantou du Kilimandjar. Anthropos. 1917–1918. V. 12–13.

- Meyer, H. E.

Manners and customs of the aborigines of the Encounter bay tribe. Wood, J. Native tribes of South Australia. Adelaide, 1879.

- Mikhailovski, V. M.

Shamanism in Siberia and European Russia. JAI. 1894–1895. V. 24.

- Mills, J. P.

The western Rengma Nagas. Census of India,1931,I (III,b), see Hutton

The Lhota Nagas. London 1922
The Ao Nagas

- Missionary records. Tahiti and Society islands. 1799.
- Missionary labours and scenes in Southern Africa. 1842.
- Missions évangéliques. 1872. XLVII (ed. Germond) / 1895. LXX / 1897. LXXII (ed. Dieterlen) / 1899. LXXIV, 1. / 1906. LXXXI, 2. / 1912. LXXXVII (ed. H. Martin) / 1915. Ed. 2 (P. Ramseyer) / 1917. XCII, 1 (M-elle Dogimont) / 1925. Ed. 2 (Una Franz)
- Mjöberg, E.

Durch die Insel der Kopfjäger. 1929.

- Moffat

1842 Missionary labours and scenes in Southern Africa

- Monsord Reklaw.

Afaiau the hermit. Bulletin de la Société des Études océaniennes. 1924. N. 9.

- Monteiro

Angola and the river Congo. 1875. V. 1–2.

- Mooney, James

Myths of the Cherokee, Bureau of American Ethnology, Report XIX, 1900
The sacred formulas of the culture. Rep. 1891. V. 7.

- Mooney and Frans M. Olbrechts

1932 The Swimmer manuscript, Bureau of American Ethnology, Bulletin n°99. Washington

- Morice, A. G.

The Dene language. Transactions of Canada Institute. 1891. (Toronto). V. 1.

- Moszkowski, M.

Stämme von Ost-Sumatra. Zeitschrift für Ethnologie. 1908. Bd. 40.
Auf Neuen Wegen durch Sumatra. Forschungsreisen in Ost- und Zentral-Sumatra (1907). Berlin, 1909.

- Mountford, C. P.

1937 Rock-paintings at Windula, Western Australia. Oceania, VII

- Müller, Ägidius:

Wahrsagerei bei den Kaffern. Anthropos. 1907. V. II. (Digital copy)

- Murray, J. H.

Papua or British New Guinea. L., 1912.

== N ==
- Nassau, F. H.

Fetichism in West Africa. 1904

- Nelson, E. W.

The Eskimo about Bering strait, Bureau of American Ethnology, Report XVIII

- Neuhauss, R.

1911 Deutsch Neu-Guinea, Band 3 (von 3) enthält Beiträge von:

S. Lehner: "Bukaua", S.397-485,
V. G. Bamler: "Tami", S.489-566,
H. Zahn: "Die Jabim", S.289-394
Ch. Keysser: "Aus dem Leben der Kai-Leute", S.3-242
Stolz: "Die Umgebung von Kap König Wilhelm", S.245-86

- Newton, H.

In far New Guinea

- Nicol, Y.

La tribu des Bakoko. 1930

- Nieuwenhuis, A. W.

In Centraal Borneo. Reis van Pontianak naar Samarinda. 1900. I. II.

- Nordenskiöld, Er.

1932 La conception de l'ame chez les Indiens Cuna, Journal des Americanistes, N.S. XXIV
1932 Faiseurs de miracles et voyants chez les Indiens Cuna, Revista del Instituto de Etnologia, Tucuman
La vie des Indiens dans le Chaco

- Nova Guinea (Wissenschaftliche Ergebnisse der Neu-Guinea-Expeditionen, veröffentlicht unter der Leitung von L.F.de Beaufort und von A. A. Pulle und L. Rutten);

XVI Ethnographie (1924-1936), daraus:

1924 Livraison I (Wirz)
1928 Livraison III (Wirz)

- North Queensland Ethnography, Bulletins of; publ. by the Queensland Government Brisbane

n°2,4,5,8 (Roth)

== O ==
- Oceania. Sponsored by the Australian National Research Council. Founded in 1930. Sydney. Oceania I,II,III,IV, ...

1930 I (Radcliffe-Brown) (Firth) (MacConnel)
1931 II (Elkin) (Piddington)
1932 III (Elkin) (Stanner) (Williams)
1933 IV (Strehlow) (Elkin) (Pink)
1934 IV (Groves)
1935 V (Wedgwood) (Tennant Kelly)
1935 VI (Elkin)
1936 VI (Pink), (Hogbin) (Mac Connel) (Kaberty)
1937 VII (Mountford)

see also Oceania Monographs

- Olbrechts, see Mooney
- Ossenbruggen, F. D. E. van

Het primitieve denken, zoals dat zich uit voornamelijk in pokkengebruiken op Java en elders. T. L. V. 1916. LXXI.

- Oyler, D. S.

The Shilluk's belief in the evil eye. Sudan Notes and Records. 1919. II. 2.

== P ==
- Packard, R. L.

1891 Notes on the mythology and religion of the Nez-Perces, Journal of American Folklore, IV

- Paredes, R. M.

Mitos, superstitiones y supervivencias populares de Bolivia

- Parker, K. Langloh

The Euahlayi tribe

- Parkinson, R.

Dreissig Jahre in der Südsee. Stuttgart, 1907.

- Parsons, Elsie C.

Taos pueblo. General series in anthropology, II, Menesha, Wisconsin
Witchcraft among the Pueblos: Indian or Spanish? Man. 1927.

- Passarge, S.

Das Okawangosumpfland und seine Bewohner. Zeitschrift für Ethnologie. 1905. Bd. 37.

- Paton, J. G.

Missionary to the New-Hebrides: An autobiography. 1898. (digital copy)

- Pechuel-Loesche

Die Loango-Expedition ausgesandt von der Deutschen Gesellschaft zur Erforschung Aequatorial-Africas, 1873-1876. 1879–1907. V. 1–3.

- Peekel, G.

1910 Religion und Zauberei auf dem mittleren Neu-Mecklenburg (Bismarck-Archipel, Südsee) Anthropos-Bibliothek Band I, Heft 3

- Perham, J.
- Sea-Dajak Religion. Journal of the Straits Branch of the Royal Asiatic Society. 1883. X.

Manangism in Borneo. Journal of the Straits Branch of the Royal Asiatic Society. 1887. XIX.

- Perrault, Charles
- Perrot, N.

Mémoire sur les moeurs, coustumes et relligion des sauvages de l'Amérique septentrionale. Leipzig; P., 1864.

- Perryman, P. W.

1936 Native witchcraft. The Uganda Journal, IV

- Petitot, Ém.

Autour du Grand Lac des Esclaves. Paris, 1891. Digital copy
Dictionnaire de la langue dènè-dindjié. Paris, 1876. Digital copy

- Pettazoni, R.

La confessione degli peccati. 1929.

- Philip, John

Researches in South-Africa, London, 1828.

- Phillips, R. С.

The Lower Congo. JAI. 1888. V. 17.

- Piddington, M. and R.

1932 Report on the field-work in N. Western Australia, Oceania II
1932 The totemistic system of the Karadjeri tribe, Oceania II

Pilsudski, Br.
1910 Schwangerschaft, Entbindung und Fehlgeburt bei den Bewohnern der Insel Sachalin. Anthropos, V

- Pink, Olive

1933 Spirit ancestors in a northern Aranda horde, Oceania IV
1936 The landowners in the northern division of the Aranda tribe, Oceania VI

- Pleyte, C. M.

Toekany Salap. Eene bijdrage tot het leerstuk dat planten bezielde wezens zijn. T. L. V. 1906. LIX.

- Portman, M. V.

Notes on the Languages of the South Andaman Groups of Tribes. JAI. 1899. V. 29.

- Powell, J.

On the Evolution of Language. E. B. Rep. 1881. V. 1.

- Powers, St.

Tribes of California, III. Washington, 1877. Contributions of North American Ethnology. V. 3.

- Powdermaker, H.

Life in Lesu

- Preuss, K. Th.

1921/23 Religion und Mythologie der Uitoto. Göttingen
1933 Der religiöse Gehalt der Mythen
Der Ursprung der Religion und Kunst. Globus. 1904. V. 86; 1905. V. 87.

- Prouteaux
- Dossier communique par M. l'administrateur en chef... 1921 (Côte d'Ivoire )
- Publications of the University of California Press. Anthropological series, XXXVI, 1935 (Du Bois)

== R ==
- Radcliffe-Brown, A.

1913 Three tribes of western Australia, Journal of the Royal Anthropological Institute XLIII
1930 The social organisation of Australian tribes, Oceania
1922 The Andaman islanders. Cambridge
1930 Compte rendu de "Notes on totemism in Eastern Australia", Oceania II
1930 Notes of totemism in Eastern Australia. Oceania. II.

- Rascher, P.

Die Sulka. Ein Beitrag zur Ethnographie von Neu-Pommern. Archiv fur Anthropologie. N. F.; Leipzig, 1904.

- Rasmussen, K.

The people of the Polar North. 1908.
1929 Intellectual Culture of the Iglulik Eskimos. (Report of the Fifth Thule-Expedition 1921-1924. Vol.VII, No.1.) Kopenhagen
1926 Thulefahrt
1931 The Netsilik Eskimos. Social Life and Spiritual Culture. (Thule-Expedition.Vol.VIII, No.1-2)
1930 Observations on the Intellectual Culture of the Caribou Eskimos. (Thule Expedition Vol.VII,2)
1930 Igluik and Caribou Eskimo Texts. (Report of the 5-th Thule Expedition Vol.VII,3)
1932 Intellectual culture of the Copper Eskimos. (Thule Expedition.Vol.IX)
Neue Menschen
Intellectual culture of the Caribou Eskimos: Report of the 5-th Thule Expedition. VII. 2–3.

- Rattray, Capt. R. S.

1923 Ashanti. Oxford
1932 The tribes of the Ashanti hinterland, 2 vols. Oxford
Ashanti proverbs. Oxford, 1916.
1927 Religions and art in Ashanti. Oxford
1933 The african child in proverb, folklore and fact, Africa,IV

- Ray, S.

Melanesian and New Guinea Songs. JAI. 1896–1897. V. 26.

- Read, С. Н.

Some Spinning Tops from Torres Straits. JAI. 1888. V. 17.

- Reed, W. A.

The Negritos of Zambales. Manila, 1904.

- Reinach, Salomon

Répertoire de l’art quarternaire. Paris 1913

- Relations de la Nouvelle-France

1638-39. Paris 1640 / 1636. P., 1637 (Hurons) / 1647 et 1648 / 1640 et 1641. P., 1642.

- Renouvier
- Report of the Bureau of Ethnography of the Smithsonian Institution. Washington E. B. Rep.
- Report of the Canadian Arctic expedition 1913-1918

XIII, Eskimo Folklore (Jenness)

- Report of the Fifth Thule Expedition 1921–1924

Vol.VII,1,2,3 / VIII,1,2 / IX (Rasmussen)

- Report on the Census of India, 1931... see: Extracts from...
- Reports of the British Association for the advancement of science

(Boas)

- Report to the Council of the League of Nations, Canberra

1930 darin: Report on the Territory of New-Guinea

- Reports of the Cambridge Anthropological Expedition to the Torres Straits

Cambridge, 1901–1908. IV.

- Reports of the Cambridge Expedition to Torres Straits

1908. V.
1908. VI.

- Revista del Instituto de Etnologia, Tucuman

1932 (Nordenskiöld)

- Revue anthropologique XLVI
- Reynolds, Н.

Notes of the Azande Tribe in the Congo. Journal of African Society. 1904.

- Ribot, Th.

Logique des sentiments. Paris, 1905.

- Riley E. B.

Among Papuan head-hunters. London, 1926.

- Rink and Boas, F.

1889 Eskimo tales and songs, Journal of American folklore, II

- Risley, Н. Н.

The Tribes and Castes of Bengal. Calcutta, 1891–1892. V. 1–9.

- Rougier, E.

Maladies et médecines à Fidji autrefois et aujourd'hui. Antropos. 1907. V. 2.

- Rollin, L.

Les îles Marquises.

- Roscher, W. H.

Die Siebenzahl. Philologus. 1901.

- Roscoe, J.

Manners and Customs of the Baganda, JRAI, XXXIV / JAI. 1901. V. 31.
The Bahima a Cow Tribe of Encole. JAI. 1907. V. 37.
The Bagesu and other tribes of the Uganda Protectorate. Cambridge, 1924.

- Roth, Dr. W. E.

Superstition, magic and medicine, North Queensland Ethnography. Bulletin n°5. Brisbane, 1903
Beiträge in Bulletin n°2/n°4/n°5/n°8/ 18??S.62
Ethnological studies among the North West Central Queensland aborigines. Brisbane; L., 1897.
North Queensland Ethnography Bulletin. Brisbane, 1903. N. 2.
Superstition, magic and medicin. North Queensland Ethnography Bulletin. Brisbane, 1903. N. 8.
North Queensland Ethnography Bulletin. Brisbane, 1903. N. 18.
An inquiry into the animism and folklore of the Guiana Indians. Reports of the Bureau of American Ethnology. 1915. XXX.

- Royal Anthropological Institute, Journal of the

== S ==
- Sagard, Fr.

Le grand voyage au pays des Hurons. Paris, 1865. V. l — 2.

- Saint-Périer, R. de

1934 Gravures anthropomorphiques de la grotte d'Isturitz, Anthropologie, XLIV

- Saintyves, Pierre

1923 Les Contes de Perrault et les récits parallèle

- Sarasin, F. and P.

Ergebnisse naturwissenschaftlicher Forschungen auf Ceylon. Wiesbaden, 1887–1893. V. 1–4.

- Saville, W. J. V.

In unknown New-Guinea. Philadelphia, 1926.

- Schadee, M. C.

Bijdrage tot de kennis van den godsdiensten der Dajaks van Landak en Tajan. T. V. L. 1903.

- Schapera, I.

The Khoisan peoples of South Africa. London, 1930.

- Schmidt, P. W.
- Die Geheime Jünglingsweihe der Karesau-Insulaner. Anthropos. 1907. V. 2.
- Schomburgk, R.

Reisen in British Guiana. Leipzig, 1847–1848. V. 1–3.

- Schoolcraft, H. R.

Historical and Statistical Information Respecting the history condition and prospec's of the Indian tribes of the United States. Philadelphia, 1851–1860. V. 1–6.

- Schuerle, G.

Die Sprache der Basa in Kamerun.

- Schumann (Missionar)
- Schweitzer, A.

À l'orée de la forêt vierge. 1929.

- Seligman, C. G. and B. Z.

The pagan tribes of the nilotic Sudan. London, 1932.
The Medicine, Surgery and Midwifery of the Sinaugolo (Torres Straits). JAI. 1902. V. 32.

- Severino de Santa Teresa, Fr.

Creencias, rites, usos y costumbres de los Indios Catios de la Prefectura apostolica de Uraba.

- Shoobert, W. H.

The aboriginal tribes of the Central Provinces. Census of India, 1931, I (III,b) see Hutton

- Sick, von Eberhard

Die Waniaturu. Baessler-Archiv. 1915. V. l — 2.

- Sierozewski, W.

The Yakut, Abridged from Russian of W. G. Sumner. JAI. 1901. V. 31.

- Skeat, W. W.

Malay Magic. London, 1900.
mit Blagden, C. O.: Pagan races of the Malay Peninsula. London, 1906. V. 1–2.

- Skinner, A.

1914 Political organization, cults and ceremonies of the Plains-Ojibway and Plains-Cree Indians, American Museum of Natural History, Anthropological Papers, IX
Social life and ceremonial bundles of the Menomini Indians, American Museum of Natural History, Anthropological Papers, XIII

- Smith and Dale

The ila-speaking peoples of northern Rhodesia. 1920 I, II

- Smith, W. R.

Lectures of the Religion of the Semites. London, 1894.

- Smithsonian Institution, Bureau of Ethnography of the
- Smyth, R. B.

The Aborigines of Victoria. Melbourne, 1878. I.

- Solomon, V.

Extracts from Diaries kept in Car Nicobar”, Journal of the Anthropological Institute, xxxii. (1902)

- Speck, Frank G.

1919 Penobscot Shamanism, Memoirs of the American anthropological Association, VI
1936 The Naskapi

- Speckmann, F.

Die Hermannsburger Mission in Afrika. 1876.

- Speiser, F.

Ethnologische Materialien aus den Neuen Hebriden und den Banks-inseln. 1923.

- Spencer

1904 Totemism in Australia, Report of the 16th meeting of the Australian Association for the advantage of science
1932 Spencers Scientific Correspondance, edited by R. R. Marett and T. K. Penniman.

- Spencer and Gillen

1927 The Arunta
1899 The Native Tribes of Central Australia. London
1904 The Northern Tribes of Central Australia. London
1928 Wanderings in Wild Australia. London

- Spier, L.

1936 Cultural relations of the Gila River and Lower Colorado Tribes:. Yale University Publications in Anthropology, III

- Spiess, C.

Zum Kultus und Zauberglauben der Evheer (Togo). Baessler-Archiv, I Digital copy

- Spieth, J.

Die Ewe-Stämme: Material zur Kunde des Ewe-Volkes in Deutsch-Togo. Berlin, 1906. Digital copy

- Spinden, J.

Nez-Percez tales. Folktales of Salishan and Sahaptin tribes, Memoirs of the American Folklore Society XI

- Spix, J.; Martius, C.

Travels in Brazil in the Years 1817–1820. London, 1814.

- Staden, Hans

Wahrhafte Historia und Beschreibung eines Landes mit wilden, nackten und grimmigen Menschenfressern, welches in der neuen Welt Amerika gelegen ist
The Captivity of Hans Stade of Hesse in A. D. 1547–1555, among the wild tribes in Eastern Brazil. Hakluyt Society. 1874. Digital copy

- Stanner, W. E. H.

The Daly river tribes, Oceania III

- Stannus, H. S.

Notes on some tribes of British E. Africa. JAI. 1910. VXL.

- Steedman, A.

Wanderings and adventures in the interior of S. Africa. I.

- Steensby, H. P.

Contributions to the Ethnology and Anthropology of the Polar Eskimos. Meddelelser on Greenland. 1910. V. 34.

- Stefanson, W.

My life with the Eskimos. 1913.

- Stayt, H. A.

1932 The Bavenda

- Steinen, Karl von den

1894 Unter den Naturvölkern Zentral-Brasiliens. Berlin
1897 2.A

- Stephan, E.

Beiträge zur Psychologie der Bewohner von Neupommern. Globus. 1905. Bd. 88.

- Stevenson, M. C.

1904 The Zuni Indians. BAE. Report XXIII
The Sia. E. B. Rep. 1893. V. 11.

- Stokes, J.

Discoveries in Australia. London, 1846.

- Strehlow, C. (and Moritz von Leonhardi)

Die Aranda- und Loritja-Stämme in Zentral-Australien. Frankfurt a. M.

I = I, 1.Teil
II = I, 2.Teil
III = I, 3.Teil, 1.Abt.
IV = I, 3.Teil, 2.Abt.

- Strehlow, T. G. H.

1933 Ankotarinja, an Aranda myth, Oceania IV

- Swan, J.

The Indians of Cape Flattery. Smithsonian contributions to knowledge. 1870. V. 16.

- Swanton, J. R.

Social Conditions, Beliefs and Linguistic Relationship of the Tlingit Indians. E. B. Rep. 1908. V. 26.

== T ==
- Talbot, D. A.

Woman’s mysteries of a primitive people. Digital copy

- Talbot, P. A.

The peoples of South Nigeria. 1926. II.

- Tanghe, Basile

De Ngbandi naar het leven geschetst. 1930.

- Taplin, Rev. G.

1879 in: Woods, J. D., Natives tribes of South-Australia
The folklore, manners, customs and languages of the South Australian aborigines. Adelaide, 1879.

- Tattevin, E.

1931 Mythes et Légendes du Sud de l'île Pentecôte. (Nouvelles Hébrides), Anthropos, XXVI

- Taylor, R.

The Ika a Maui, or New Zealand and its Inhabitants. London 1870.

- Teit, James A.

1898 Traditions of the Thompson river Indians, Memoirs of the American Folklore Society VI
1917 Okanogon tales. Folktales of Salishan and Sahaptin tribes, Memoirs of the American Folklore Society, XI
Thompson tales. Folktales of Salishan and Sahaptin
The Salishan Tribes of the Western Plateau, Annual Report No. 45 (Washington, D.C.: Bureau of American Ethnology, 1928)
Okanagon tales. Folktales of Salishan and Sahaptin. Memoirs of the American Folklore Society. 1910. XI.

- Tenant, Kelly, C.

1935 Tribes of Cherburg settlement Queensland. Oceania V

- Le Testu

Notes sur les coutumes Bapounou dans la circonscription de la Nyanga. Caen. 1918.

- Thalbitzer, W.

The Ammassalik Eskimo, II. Meddelelser om Grönland, XL
Ethnographical collections from East Greenland. Meddeleser om Groenland. 1922. XXXIX.

- Thomas, N. W.

Letters from Victorian pioneers Digital copy

- Thomas, Th. M.

1872 Eleven years in Central South Africa. 1872.
Le Bakana (N. E. Transvaal). Bulletin de la société de géographie de Neuchâtel. 1895. V. 8.

- Thompson, S.

Tales of the North-American Indians

- Thomson B.

Note upon the Natives of Savage Island, or Niue. JAI. 1901. V. 31.
The Kalou-Vu (Ancestors-Gods) of the Fijians. JAI. 1894–1895. V. 24.

- Thomson, Donald F.

The hero cult, initiation and totemism on Cape York. Journal of the Royal Anthropological Institute, LXIII

- Thurn, Im

Among the Indians of Guiana. London 1883

- Thurnwald, R.

Im Bismark-Archipel und auf den Salomo-Inseln. Zeitschrift für Ethnologie. 1910. V. 42.
Forschungen auf den Salomo-Inseln und dem Bismarck-Archipel. Berlin, 1913.

- Thurston, E.

1906 Ethnographic notes in Southern India. Madras, 1906

- Tijdschrift voor taal-, land- en volkenkunde van Nederlansch Indonesie, LXXII (Kruyt)
- Togo-Cameroun

1935 Henry de Marqueissac, Une peuplade Togolaise les Cabrais (Togo-Cameroun, Paris 1935)

- Torday, E., Joyce, T.

Notes on the Ethnography of the Ba-Huana. JAI. 1906. V. 26.

- Torrend, J.

Comparative grammar of the South African Bantu languages. London, 1891. Digital copy

- Travaux et mémoires de l'Institut d'ethnologie

VIII (Leenhardt)
IX (Leenhardt)
XVI (Gaden)

- Trezenem, Ed.

Notes ethnographiques sur les tribus Fan du Moyen Ogooué (Gabon). Journal des Africanistes, VI 1936

- Turner, G.

19 years in Polynesia. 1861.
Samoa, a hundred years ago and long before. London 1884.

- Tylor, E. B.

Primitive culture. London 1903. V. 1–2.

== U ==
- The Uganda Journal, IV, 1936
- University of California Press, Publications of the

(Forde)

- Usener, H.

Dreiheit. Ein Versuch mythologischer Zahlenlehre. Rheinisches Museum. 1903. V

== V ==
- H. Valdizan y A. Maldonado

La medicina popular peruana, 1 (1922)

- Vedder, H.

Die Bergdama. 1923. I.

- Verguet, L.

Histoire de la premiere mission catholique au Vicariat de Melanesie. (San Christobai).

- Vertenten, P.

Zeichen und Malkunst der Marindenesen. Internationales Archiv für Ethnographie. 1915. XXII.

- Viaene L., Witte Pater.

Uit het leven der Bhunde. Congo. II. 2.

- Voth, H. R.

The Traditions of the Hopi. Publications of Field Columbian Museum. Anthropological Serie. 1905. V. 8.

== W ==
- Wakefield

Adventure in New Zealand, from 1839 to 1844: With Some Account of the Beginning of the British Colonization of the Islands Digital copy

- Walker, A.

Un enterrement chez les Ishogos. Bulletin de la Société de Recherche Congolaise. 1928.

- Wangemann, Th.

Geschichte der Berliner Missionsgesellschaft und ihrer Arbeiten in Südafrika. Berlin, 1872–1874. Bd. 1–4.

- Ward, H.

Five years with the Congo Cannibals. London, 1890. Digital copy

- Warmelo, J. N.

Contributions towards Venda history, religion, and tribal ritual

- Warneck, J.

Die Religion der Batak. 1909.

- Webster, H.

Primitive secret societies. N.Y., 1908. Digital copy

- Wechel, P. te

Erinnerungen aus den Ost- und West-Dusun-ländern, (Borneo), Internationales Archiv für Ethnographie, xxii. (1914)

- Weeks, J. Rev.

Anthropological Notes on the Bangala of the Upper Congo River. JAI. 1909–1910. V. 39–40.

- Werner, Alice

Myth and legends of the Bantu, 1933

- Westermann, D.

Die Kpelle. Göttingen; Leipzig, 1921.
Grammatik der Ewesprache. Berlin, 1907.

- West-Indische Gids

1932 XIII (de Goeje)

- Weyersberg, Maria
- Wedgwood, Camilla H.

1935 Sickness and its treatment in Manam island. Oceania, V

- Whitehead, G.

1924 In the Nicobar Islands

- Widenmann, A.

Die Kilimandscharo-Bevölkerung. Petermann's Mitteilungen. 1899. Ergänzungsheft.

- Wilhelmi, Ch.

Manners and customs of the Australian natives in particular of the port Lincoln. Transactions of the Royal Society of Victoria. 1860, (Melbourne). V. 5.

- Wilken, G. A.

Handleiding voor de vergelijkende volkenkunde van Nederlandsch-Indië. Leiden 1893 Digital copy

- Williams, F. E.

Trading voyages from the Gulf of Papua, Oceania III 1932
1936 Papuans of the Trans-Fly
Orokaiva Society. London, 1930

- Williams, Th., Calvert, J.

Fiji and the Fijians. London, 1870. Digital copy I, II

- Williamson, R. W.

The Mafulu Mountain People of British New Guinea. London, 1912. Digital copy

- Wilson, H. L.
- Wilson, J. L.

Western Africa

- Wilson-Haffenden, J. R.

1927/8 Ethnological Notes on the Kwottos of Toto (Panda) District, Keffi Division, Benue Province, Northern Nigeria; Journal of African Society, XXVII

- Van Wing, J. (S. J.)

1930 Enfants noirs, Congo, III
De geheime sekte van't Kimpasi.
Etudes Bakongo. 1921.

- Winterbottom, Th.

An account of the native Africans in the neighbourhood of Sierra Leone. London, 1803. V. 1–2.

- Wirz, P.

1924 Anthropologische und ethnologische Ergebnisse der Central Neu-Guinea Expedition 1921-22, Nova Guinea, XVI, Livraison I
1928 Beitrag zur Ethnologie der Sentanier (Holländisch-Neuguinea), Nova Guinea XVI, Livraison IV
Die Marind-anim von Holländisch- Süd-Neu-Guinea 4 Teile in 2 Bänden:

I. Teil Die materielle Kultur der Marind-anim. 1922
II. Teil Die religiösen Vorstellungen und die Mythen der Marind-anim, sowie die Herausbildung der totemistisch-sozialen Umgebung (einzeln u.a. auch als Diss. Basel 192? mit Karte)
III. Teil Das soziale Leben der Marind-anim. 1925
IV. Teil Die Marind-anim in ihren Festen, ihrer Kunst und ihren Kenntnissen und Eigenschaften

- Wissmann, Major von
- Woods, J. D.

1879 Native tribes of South-Australia

- von Wrangel

Einige Bemerkungen zur Kenntnis des russischen Reiches. (von Baer and Helmersen), I

== Y ==
- Yale University Publications in anthropology

1936 V (Hill)

- Yarrow, H. C.

A Further Contribution in the Study of the Mortuary Customs of the North American Indians. E. B. Rep. 1880, V. 1.

== Z ==
- Zeitschrift für Eingeborenen-Sprachen

XXI (Berthoud)

- Zeitschrift für Ethnologie

1930 LXII

- Zeitschrift für Vergleichende Rechtswissenschaft

XXXV (Adam)

== Works ==
- Les fonctions mentales dans les sociétés inférieures (1910), Gallica
- La mentalité primitive , Paris, Félix Alcan, coll. "Bibliothèque de philosophie contemporaine" (1922), Gallica. Rééd. Flammarion, coll. "Champs classiques", 2010, 658 p.
- L'âme primitive (1927), Gallica
- Le surnaturel et la nature dans la mentalité primitive (1931), Gallica
- Quelques aspects de la mentalité primitive, Nouvelle revue française n°240, septembre 1933.
- La mythologie primitive Paris, Félix Alcan, coll. "Bibliothèque de philosophie contemporaine" (1935), Gallica
- L'expérience mystique et les symboles chez les Primitifs (1938), at the website of UQAC. Rééd. Dunod, 2014, 256 p.
- Carnets, PUF, coll. "Bibliothèque de philosophie contemporaine", 1949 (1^{e} édition " Quadrige ", 1998, 320 p., présentation de Bruno Karsenti). UQAC

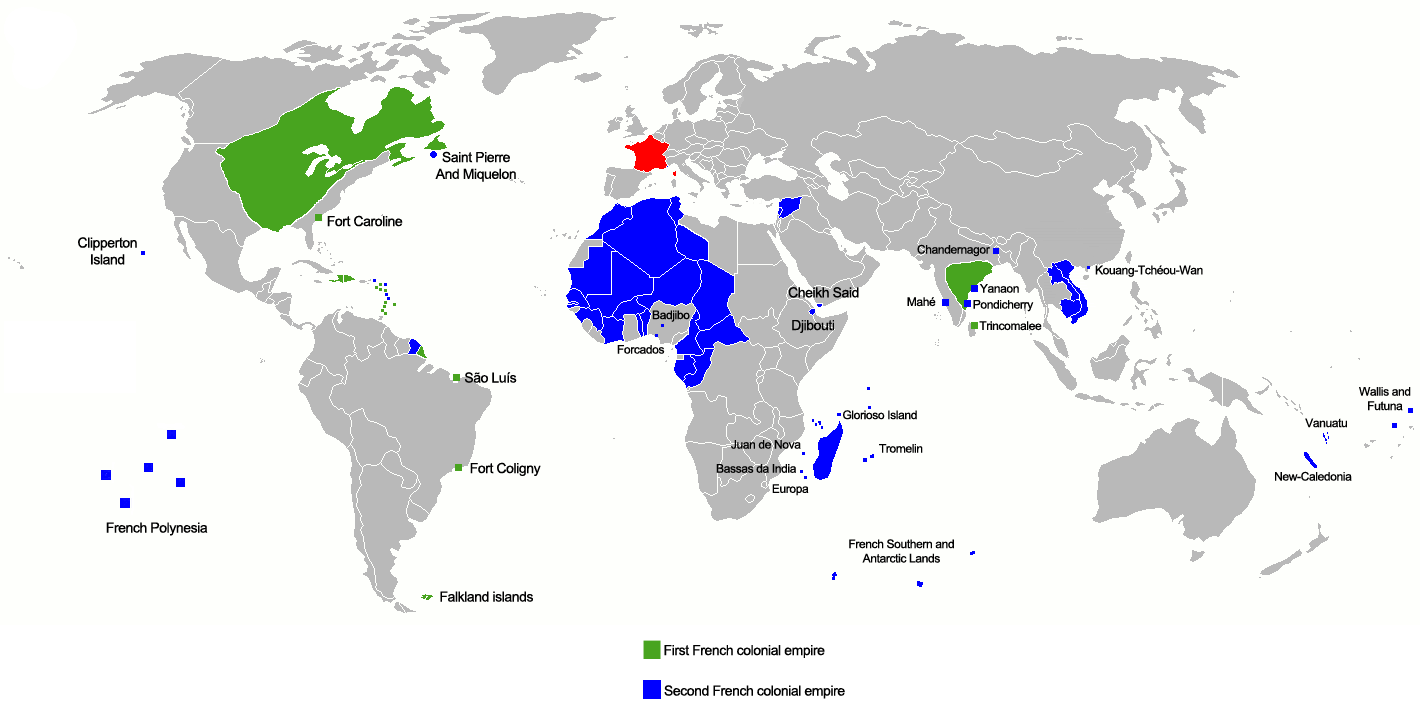
French Colonial Empire (green: initial acquisitions in the 16th century; blue: acquisitions up to 1920; bluish grey: spheres of influence in India (18th century), China (1885–1940), and Siam (1897–1939))

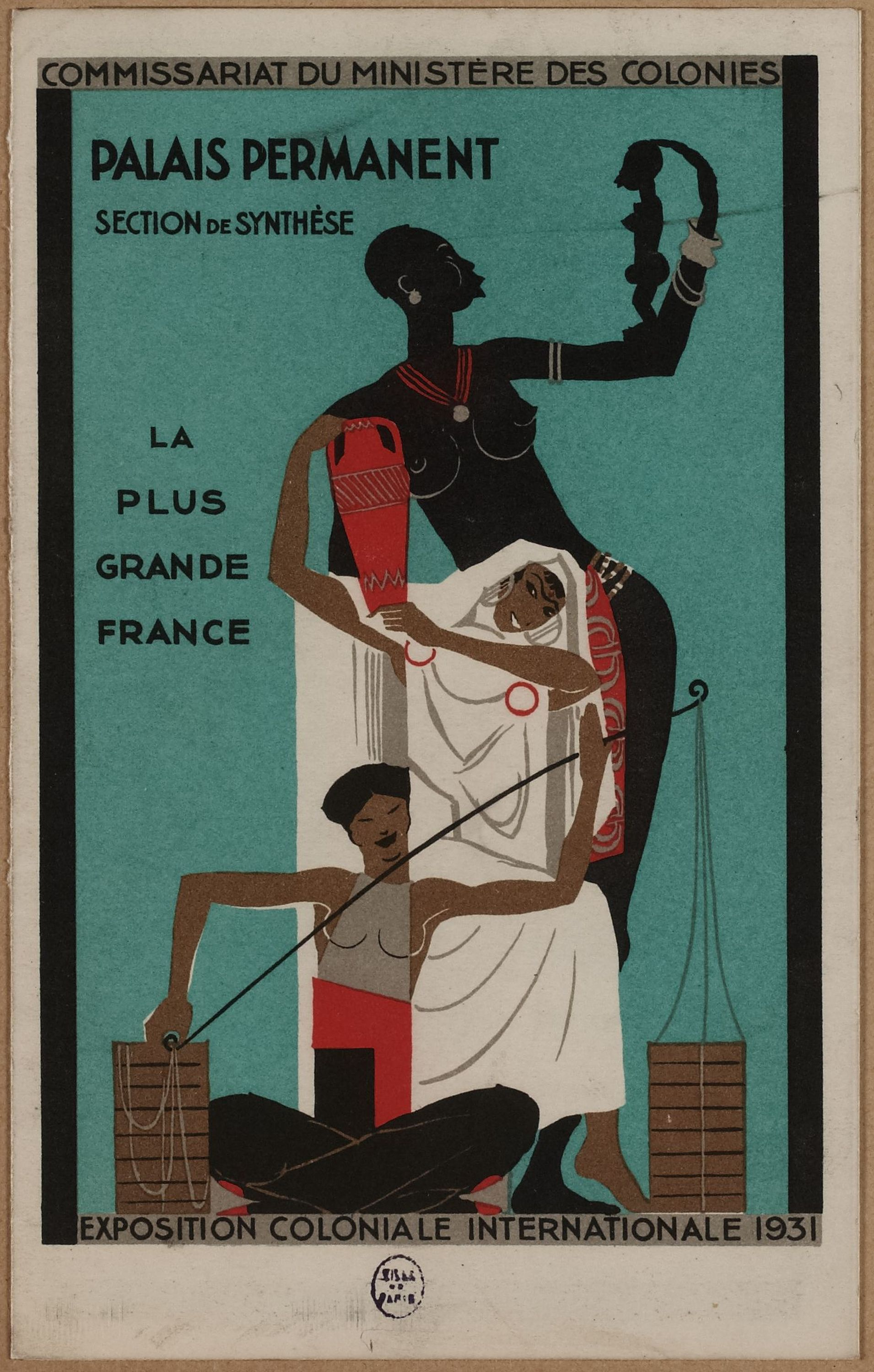
"La plus grande France"

== See also ==
- Mémoires de l'Institut d'ethnologie
- Travaux et mémoires de l'Institut d'ethnologie
- Histoire du monde
- Bibliothèque de philosophie contemporaine
- Works issued by the Hakluyt Society
