= The Bugis =

- Author: Christian Pelras
- Language: English
- Series: The Peoples of South-East Asia and the Pacific
- Subject: The Bugis and their culture
- Genre: History and Culture
- Publisher: Blackwell Publishing
- Publication date: United States: January 1997; Rest of the World: December 1996
- Pages: 384
- ISBN: 978-0-631-17231-4
- OCLC: 33207980
- Dewey Decimal: 959.8/4 20
- LC Class: DS632.B85 P45 1996

The Bugis is a book written by Christian Pelras about the Bugis people. It was produced in 1996 and published in the United States in 1997 by Blackwell Publishing. It is the first book ever to describe the history of the Bugis ranging from their origins 40,000 years ago to the present. The book is one of the books under The Peoples of South-East Asia and the Pacific book series.

The Bugis contents are divided into two parts; the first part "The Shaping of Identity: from Origins to the Classical Age" which covers five topics and the second part "Society and Culture: Lasting Aspects and Modern Transformation" which contains four topics.

== Reception ==
In a review in the Journal of the Malaysian Branch of the Royal Asiatic Society, Zawawi Ibrahim praised the text, stating "It excels not only as a scholarly work which is sensitive to both the nuances of anthropology and history, but also as a text which is readable to both scholars and non-scholars of Bugis society, as well as the general public."

Writing a review for the book in the Journal of Southeast Asian Studies, Ian Caldwell praised the text, saying "It is a work produced of sound scholarship coupled with an unrivaled personal knowledge of its subject, and is certain to become the introductory reference on its subject for years to come." Caldwell also adds "The book's historical section is controversial but provides archaeologically testable interpretations, while the anthropological section offers an excellent introduction to modern Bugis society."

Reviewing the book in the journal Bijdragen tot de Taal-, Land- en Volkenkunde, Sirtjo Koolhof gave a mixed critique. While Koolhof praised the originality and the comprehensive account of Bugis history and culture, he criticized Pelras's reconstruction of early Bugis history which relied on the La Galigo. Koolhof stated "Taking the contents of an epic-mythological work as historical references to actual past events is a hazardous operation, demanding a sound, consistent analysis approach to the material. Pelras does not take such an approach."
