= Presbyterian Church in Liberia =

- Country: Liberia
- Denomination: Presbyterian

The Presbyterian Church in Liberia is a historic church in Liberia in the Presbyterian Reformed tradition. It was formerly a Presbytery of the Cumberland Presbyterian Church, now it is an independent, self-governing denomination.

== History ==
Liberia was settled by American slaves, before it became a colony. In 1833 the PC(USA) begun to work in Liberia. Liberia was a Republic after a Constitution was adopted in 1847. In 1850 the American Board of Commissioners for Foreign Missions sent missionaries, among them was J. Leighton Wilson.

The church established Alexander High School in Monrovia, Liberia. It is a well known fact in Liberia that a significant number of independence and post independence leaders were leaders of the Presbyterian Church or educated in the Alexander School. The Presbytery of Liberia become independent in 1928, and this is also the founding date of this denomination. In 1944 the church started its own mission work in the Todee District. In 1980 the church become a provisional presbytery of the Cumberland Presbyterian Church.

In 2006 in Cheersburg the church decided at its annual Synod to sever all relations with the Cumberland Presbyterian Church, the Synod of Tennessee, put an end to a more than two decade long partnership.

== Statistics ==
The church has 15 congregations across Liberia and more than 3,000 members.

- First Presbyterian Church in Monrovia, Liberia
- First Presbyterian Church in Careysburg, Liberia
- Evangelical Presbyterian Church in 3rd Street, Sinkor, Liberia
- Trinity Presbyterian Church in Paynesville
- Yekepa Presbyterian Church in Yekepa City, Liberia
- St. Paul Presbyterian Church in Gardnesville Township, Liberia
- Gwee Town Presbyterian Church in Todee District, Montserrado County, Liberia
- First Presbyterian Church Marshall Margibi County
- Faith Presbyterian Church Sinkor, Liberia
- Granger Presbyterian Church in Johnsonville Township, Liberia
- Croizerville Presbyterian Church in Crozierville, Liberia
- St. Marks Presbyterian Church in Fansehn Town, Liberia
- Marshall Presbyterian Church in Marshall City, Liberia
- First Presbyterian Church Schiefflin in Margibi County, Liberia
- Gbarnshue Preaching Point in Zota Clan
- New Horizon Presbyterian Church in Harper City, Liberia
- Bomi Presbyterian Preaching point in Bomi County, Liberia

The current Moderator of the Presbyterian Church is Rev. Rev. Sanjee A. Stepter. Name of Minister of the Presbyterian Church: 1. Rev. Sando E. Townsend * 2. Rev. Aaron C. Smith 3. Rev. Solomon K. Akorsah 4. Rev. Solomon H. Garjaye 5. Rev. G. Boimah Freeman 6. Rev. Plezzant C. Harris 7. Rev. Dave B. G. Kiamu 8. Rev. Sanjee Abioseh Stepter 9. Rev. Sayply Clerk 10. Rev. Emery Ghaicarn 11. Rev. Sam S. Kwadeh 12. Rev. Robert B. Lee, III 13. Rev. Lester R. Lee 14. Rev. Menwon Shasha 15. Rev. Ishmael Cole 16. Rev. Dwedw G. Townsend 17. Rev. Rita E. Townsend 18. Rev. Lawrence Bayusie 19. Rev. C. Wellington Morgan 20. Rev. Victor E. Helb 21. Rev. Coker A. J. George, Jr 22. Rev. L. Abba Diggs 23. Rev. Augustus T. Turker 24. Rev. C. Vivian Sisuse 25. Rev. Shadrack M'bock 26. Rev. Jerries L. Walker 27. Rev. Ernest Urey 29. Rev. Jackson Targee 30. Rev. Janjay Biamon 31. Rev. varney Boimah 32. Rev. Eugene Olu Eastman 33. Rev. James Lee 34. Rev. Amelia C. Stryker 35. Rev. Richard Ballingggar 36. Rev. George W. Tugbeh 37. Rev. Caesar B. Snyder 38. Rev. Cornelia Greene Mayson 39. Rev. Andrew Kolubah 40. Rev. John Karmo

Names of Candidates/Licentiate: 1. Lic. Victor B. Kromah 2. Lic. David Kollie 3. Lic. Joe P. Sumo 4. Lic. Edward Peters 5. Lic. David Sumo 6. Lic. John T. Wright

== Interchurch relations ==
The Presbyterian Church in Liberia is a denominational member of the World Communion of Reformed Churches. The First Presbyterian Church and the Living Water Fellowship Church both in Monrovia, Liberia are congregational members of the World Reformed Fellowship.
