= Maurice Leenhardt =

Maurice Leenhardt (9 March 1878 – 26 January 1954), was a French pastor and ethnologist specialising in the Kanak people of New Caledonia.

== Life ==
Leenhardt was born in Montauban.

At the beginning of the twentieth century, Protestant authorities concerned themselves with the evangelisation of the Kanaks, in competition with the Marist Brothers. Maurice Leenhardt was named pastor in 1902 in New Caledonia where he founded the "Dö nèvâ" mission in the valley of Houailou. Going beyond his role of pastor, he applied himself to understanding the mentality of these people.

When he arrived in New Caledonia, Maurice Leenhardt was welcomed by these words from the mayor of Nouméa: What have you come to do here? In ten years there will be no more Kanaks. He applied himself to the fight against this slow genocide; he combatted the alcoholism that slowly ravaged the Kanak people. He translated the New Testament into the Houaïlou language with the help of his first students.

He returned to France in 1927 where he founded the Société des Océanistes and the Musée de l'Homme, and took the chair of Lucien Lévy-Bruhl at the École des Hautes Études en Sciences Sociales. Following a second stay of nearly ten years in New Caledonia, he began teaching Oceanic languages at the Institut National des Langues et Civilisations Orientales in 1944.

He died in Paris.

Leenhardt's daughter Stella married the historian of religions and theologian Henry Corbin (1933).

== Contributions to Ethnology ==
Maurice Leenhardt's contributions to ethnology are considerable, though he did not frame them theoretically.

Before Bronislaw Malinowski, he practiced the ethnology advocated by Marcel Mauss from his office in Paris. For twenty-five years he practiced participant observation and active research, the virtues of which were not rediscovered until the 1960s.

Maurice Leenhardt was not a dogmatist and through all these contributions, he never sought followers.

He was nevertheless one of the first to consider social phenomena in their totality and to study the art, myths, and customs of the Kanak people as well as their language.

== Works ==
- Le Mouvement éthiopien au sud de l'Afrique (1902)
- La Grande Terre (1909, expanded edition 1922)
- Traduction du Nouveau Testament en langue houaïlou (1922)
- Notes d'ethnologie néo-calédonienne (1930)
- Documents néo-calédoniens. (1932)
- Vocabulaire et grammaire de la langue houaïlou (1935)
- Gens de la Grande Terre (1937)
- Alfred Boegner (1938)
- Langues et dialectes de l'Austro-Mélanésie (1946)
- L'art océanien. (1947)
- Do Kamo. La personne et le mythe dans le monde mélanésien (1947)
- Notes de sociologie religieuse sur la région de Canala (Nouvelle-Calédonie) (1958)
- Several papers in the Journal de la Société des Océanistes.
