= Ernst Brutzer =

German Protestant missionary

Ernst Martin Brutzer (born 1873 in Riga; died 23 February 1940 in Braunschweig) was a Baltic German theologian, historian, and Protestant missionary.

== Life and work ==
From 1892 to 1897, Brutzer studied history, philosophy, and theology at the University of Dorpat (now the University of Tartu). After completing his studies, he served as a missionary of the Leipzig Mission, working in British East Africa and later in India. From 1920 onward, Brutzer worked as a Protestant pastor. In 1924, he took up a pastoral post in Braunschweig. He had been married to Wilhelmine Kügler from Roop since 1909. After his return to Germany, he worked as a pastor in Warberg near Helmstedt.

Brutzer wrote about his experiences in Africa, especially the Wakamba (Kamba) in East Africa. His publication on the history of St. Magni Church in Braunschweig in 1931 was published on the occasion of the 900th anniversary of the charter of 1031 preserved in the city archive, with chapters on this document as well as on the church's name, architectural development, interior furnishings, parish life, church property, and the pastors of the church since the Reformation.

== See also ==
- Leipziger Missionswerk (in German)

== Publications ==
- Begegnungen mit Wakamba während meines ersten Halbjahres in Afrika. Leipzig, Verlag der Evangelischen Mission 1902 (Lichtstrahlen im dunkeln Erdteile 6)
- Was Kambajungen treiben. Leipzig : Ev.-Luth. Mission 1904 (Lichtstrahlen im dunklen Erdteile / Kleine Serie ; Nr. 2)
- Der Geisterglaube bei den Kamba: eine Missionsstudie. Verl. der Evang.-Luth. Mission 1905
- Handbuch der Kambasprache. In: Mittheilungen des Seminars für Orientalische Sprachen. Jahrgang IX, 3. Abteilung: Afrikanische Studien. Eduard Sachau (Hrsg.) Berlin, Spemann, 1906
- St. Magni Gedenkbuch 1931. Die Geschichte der St.-Magni-Kirche zu Braunschweig in neun Jahrhunderten. Kommissionsverlag Wollermann & Bodenstab, o. A., Braunschweig 1931

== Bibliography ==
- Gerhard Lindblom: The Akamba in British East Africa; an ethnological monograph. 2d Edition, enlarged. Archives d'Études Orientales, publ. par J.-A. Lundell; Vol. 17. Uppsala; Appelbergs Boktryckeri, 1920
