= Notes on the Folklore of the Fjort =

- Author: Richard Edward Dennett
- Language: English
- Genre: History
- Publisher: London, Pub. for the Folk-lore Society by D. Nutt
- Publication date: 1898
- Pages: 256

Notes on the Folklore of the Fjort is a book by Richard Edward Dennett (introduction by Mary H. Kingsley) published in 1898.

It contains more than 30 traditional stories from French Congo which were collected by the Folklore Society of London.
