= At the Back of the Black Man's Mind =

- Author: Richard Edward Dennett
- Language: English
- Genre: History
- Publisher: Forgotten Books
- Publication date: 1906
- Pages: 353
- ISBN: 978-1605-0601-18
- OCLC: 636962901

At the Back of the Black Man's Mind is a book by Richard Edward Dennett published in 1906. It provides many details on the folklore, culture, and religion of the Bantu and Yoruba.
