= William Thalbitzer =

Danish philologist and Eskimologist (1873–1958)

- Born: 1873; Helsingør
- Died: 1958 (aged 84–85); Usserød
- Education: University of Copenhagen
- Occupation: Philologist
- Spouse: Ellen Locher Thalbitzer (m. 1905)
- Awards: Loubat Prize

William C. Thalbitzer (5 February 1873 in Helsingør – 18 September 1958 in Usserød) was a Danish philologist and professor of Eskimo studies at the University of Copenhagen. He studied Danish, English and Latin at the university, but after graduating in 1899 he decided to focus on "exotic" languages. In 1900 he spent a year in Ilulissat in western Greenland studying the Greenlandic language. From 1905 to 1907 he with his wife spent eighteen months among the natives in Tasiilaq, one of the most isolated places on the coast of eastern Greenland. In 1920 the University of Copenhagen established a permanent lecture position for Thalbitzer in "Greenlandic (Eskimo) language and culture". In 1952 he was made an honorary doctor at the University of Copenhagen.

== Publications ==
- Thalbitzer, William C. (1974). A Phonetical Study of the Eskimo Language, Based on Observations Made on a Journey in North Greenland 1900–1901. AMS Press. p. 405. ISBN 0-404-11692-2.
- Thalbitzer, William C. (1931). The Ammassalick Eskimo: Contributions to the Ethnology of the East Greenland Natives. AMS Press. ISBN 0-404-11689-2.
- Thalbitzer, William (c. 1947). To fjærne runestene fra Grønland og Amerika. København: Gyldendalske Boghandel.
- Thalbitzer, William C. (1951). Two runic stones, from Greenland and Minnesota. Washington: Smithsonian Institution.
- William Thalbitzer at Find in a Library
