= Lucien Lévy-Bruhl =

French philosopher and anthropologist (1857-1939)

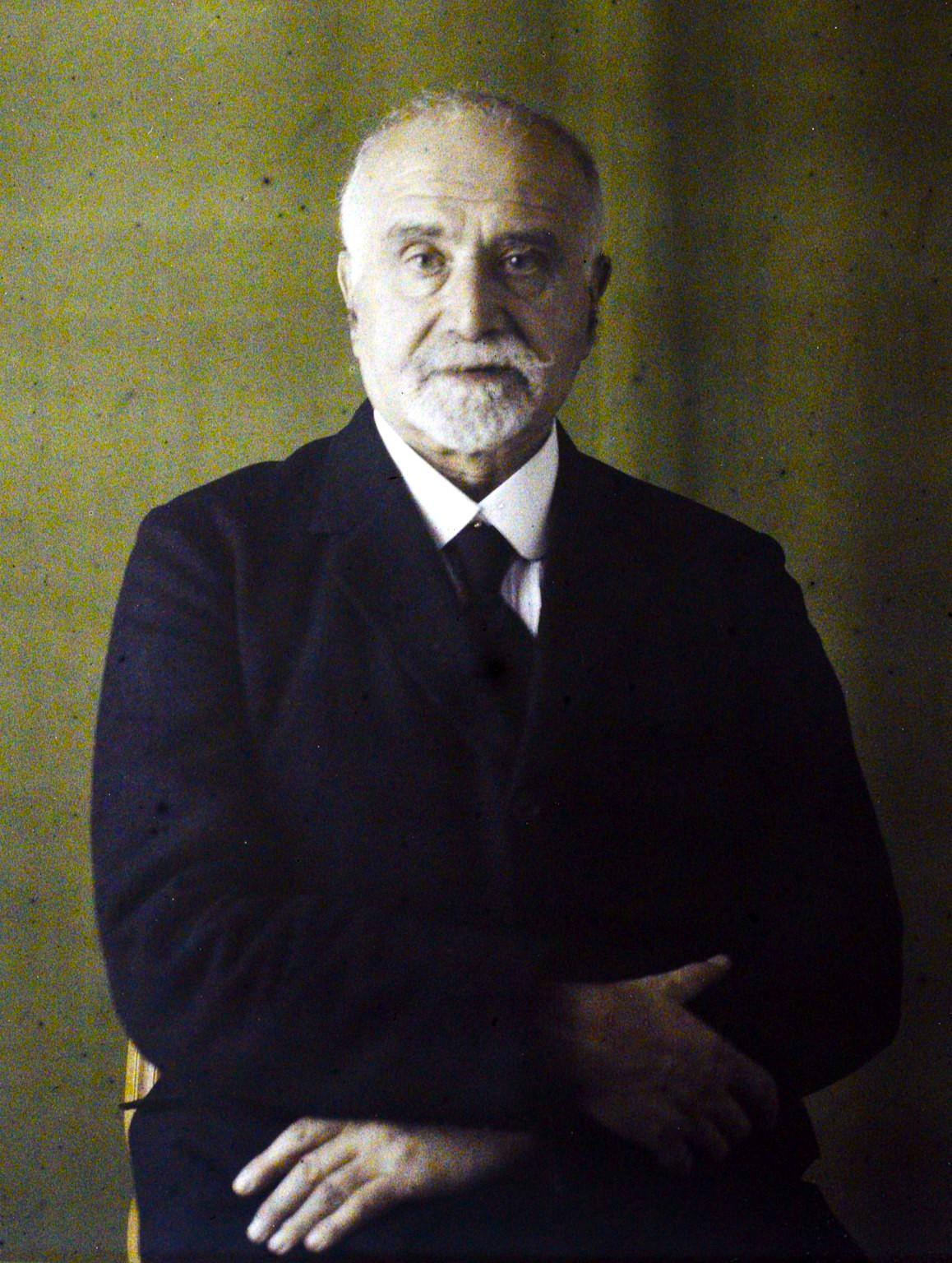
- Autochrome by Georges Chevalier, 1923
- Born: 10 April 1857; Paris, France
- Died: 13 March 1939 (aged 81); Paris, France

Academic background
- Education: École Normale Supérieure
- Doctoral advisor: Émile Boutroux

Academic work
- Discipline: Philosophy, sociology, ethnology
- Institutions: University of Paris
- Doctoral students: Alice Voinescu
- Notable students: Étienne Gilson

Lucien Lévy-Bruhl (French: [levi bʁyl]; 10 April 1857 – 13 March 1939) was a French scholar trained in philosophy who furthered anthropology with his contributions to the budding fields of sociology and ethnology. His primary field interest was ways of thinking.

== Biography ==
Born in Paris, Lévy-Bruhl wrote about the mind in his work How Natives Think (1910), where he posited, as the two basic mindsets of mankind, the "primitive" and the "modern". The primitive mind does not differentiate the supernatural from reality but uses "mystical participation" to manipulate the world. According to Lévy-Bruhl, the primitive mind does not address contradictions. The modern mind, by contrast, uses reflection and logic.

Lévy-Bruhl did not necessarily believe in a historical and evolutionary teleology leading from the primitive mind to the modern, but this is often assumed because his work is rarely read in full; rather, his thought is more dynamic, as shown by his later Notebooks on Primitive Mentality, where he notes that non-logical thought is common in modern societies, such as in gambling practices. Sociologist Stanislav Andreski argued that despite its flaws, Lévy-Bruhl's How Natives Think was an accurate and valuable contribution to anthropology, perhaps even more so than better-known work by Claude Lévi-Strauss.

Lévy-Bruhl's work, especially the concepts of collective representations and participation mystique, influenced the psychological theory of Carl Jung.

His thought also plays a large part in the work of Norman O. Brown.

== Works ==
- History of Modern Philosophy in France (1899)
- La philosophie d'Auguste Comte (1900), translated as The Philosophy of Auguste Comte. 1903 – via Project Gutenberg.
- Les fonctions mentales dans les sociétés inférieures (1910), translated as How Natives Think (1926)
- La mentalité primitive (1922), translated as Primitive Mentality (1923)
- L'âme primitive (1927), translated as The "Soul" of the Primitive (1928, reedited in 1965 with a foreword by E. E. Evans-Pritchard)
- Le surnaturel et la nature dans la mentalité primitive (1931), translated as Primitives and the Supernatural (1936)
- La mythologie primitive (Primitive Mythology, 1935)
- L'expérience mystique et les symboles chez les primitifs (The Mystic Experience and Primitive Symbolism, 1938)
- Les carnets de Lucien Lévy-Bruhl (Notebooks of Lucien Lévy-Bruhl, published posthumously in 1949)

== See also ==
- Bibliography of sources in Lucien Lévy-Bruhl's ethnological research
