= George Turner (missionary) =

English missionary

- Born: 1818; Irvine, Ayrshire, Scotland
- Died: 19 May 1891; London, England

George Turner (1818 – 19 May 1891) was an English missionary, active in Samoa and elsewhere in the South Pacific.

He was the author of Nineteen Years in Polynesia: Missionary Life, Travels, and Researches in the Islands of the Pacific, 1861. He also wrote Samoa A Hundred Years Ago and Long Before, 1884.
