= Alfred Thomas Bryant =

British colonial administrator

- Born: 4 October 1860
- Died: 17 December 1941 (aged 81); Newton Stewart, Scotland
- Occupation: Colonial administrator

Alfred Thomas Bryant (4 October 1860 – 17 December 1941) was a British colonial administrator who served in British Malaya from 1883 to 1917.

== Career ==
Bryant joined the civil service in the Straits Settlements in 1883 and, after passing the Malay language examination, his first appointment was as acting Third Magistrate, and then as Acting Collector of Land Revenue in Penang. In 1889, he became the Acting District Officer of Province Wellesley South and Magistrate before being transferred to the Dindings.

After passing the Tamil language examination he was transferred to Malacca where he acted as Collector of Land Revenue, and head of the Treasury. He then returned to Penang and spent the next ten years, from 1895 to 1905, as First Magistrate, and Inspector of Schools.

In 1905, he moved to Singapore where he continued to serve in the position as magistrate, as well as Colonial Treasurer, whilst also becoming a member of the Executive Council and the Legislative Council of the Straits Settlements. In 1912, he briefly acted as Deputy Governor of the Straits Settlements during the absence of the Governor.

In 1914, he returned to Penang and spent three years in the role of Resident Councillor. One of his last reported engagements was to officiate at the opening of the Kapitan Keling Mosque redevelopment, before he retired in May 1917. He died in Newton Stewart, Scotland in 1941, aged 80.
