= Green Hill Jones =

American politician

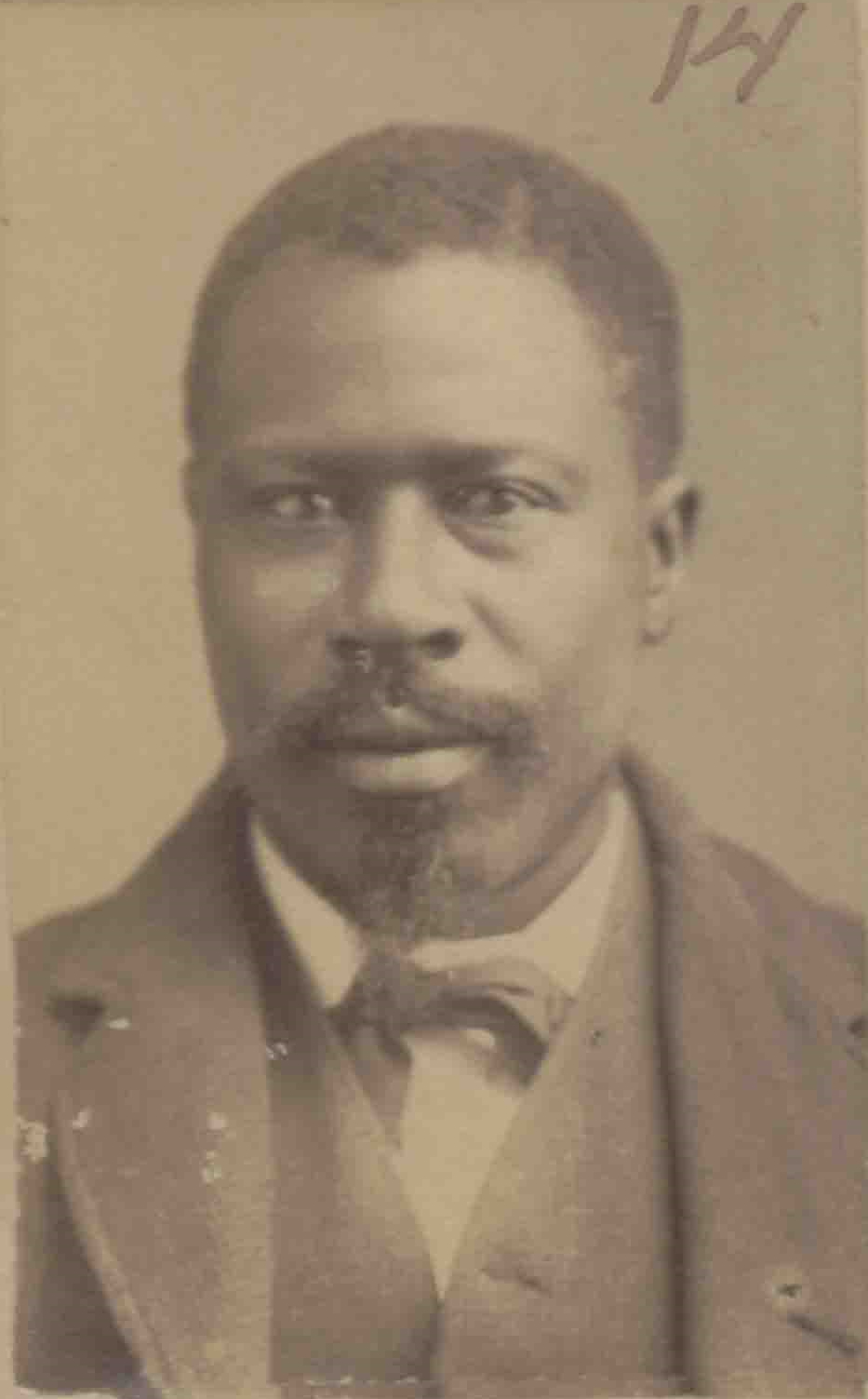

Arkansas House of Representatives
- In office 1885–1885

Arkansas House of Representatives
- In office 1889–1889

Personal details
- Born: December 24, 1842 Tennessee
- Died: November 24, 1924 (aged 81)
- Resting place: Mason (African American) Cemetery in Chicot County
- Party: Republican
- Education: Hillsdale College

Military service
- Allegiance: United States
- Branch/service: Union Army
- Battles/wars: American Civil War

Green Hill Jones (December 24, 1842 - November 12, 1924) was a state legislator and Baptist minister in Arkansas. He served in the Arkansas House of Representatives for Chicot County in 1885 and 1889, and he was a Republican.

1885 House of Representatives composite photo of the Twenty-Fifth General Assembly of the State of Arkansas

Jones was born in Tennessee and was enslaved on Kenneth Rayner's plantation in Chicot County, Arkansas. During the American Civil War he served in a "Colored" unit in the Union Army. He studied at Hillsdale College in Michigan from 1870 until 1873.

He also served as Chicot County treasurer from 1874 to 1876.

He died November 12, 1924, and is buried at Mason (African American) Cemetery in Chicot County.

== See also ==
- African American officeholders from the end of the Civil War until before 1900
