= Hutton Webster =

American sociologist

- Born: March 24, 1875; Malone, New York
- Died: May 20, 1955 (aged 80); Belmont, California
- Education: Stanford University; Harvard University
- Scientific career
- Fields: Sociology
- Institutions: Williams College; University of Nebraska; Stanford University

David Hutton Webster (March 24, 1875 − May 20, 1955) was an American sociologist, economist and anthropologist. He was Lecturer Emeritus of Sociology at Stanford University.

== Biography ==
David Hutton Webster was born in Malone, New York on March 24, 1875. He went to California in 1893, receiving a A. B. from Stanford University in 1896, where he subsequently served as an assistant in economics from 1899 to 1900. From 1902 he was a teaching fellow in economics at Harvard University, where he received his Ph.D. in economics in 1904. For the next three years Webster was assistant professor of economics at Williams College in Williamstown, Massachusetts. From there Webster went to the University of Nebraska, where he was professor of Social Anthropology until 1933. He was later hired by Stanford University, of which his former classmate Ray Lyman Wilbur was president, serving there since 1940 as Lecturer Emeritus of Sociology.

Webster was a member of the American Anthropological Association, the American Folklore Society, the American Sociological Society, the International Institute of Sociology, the Royal Anthropological Institute, Phi Beta Kappa, Pi Gamma Mu, the Harvard Club of New York, the Cosmos Club of Washington, D. C., and the Press and Union League Club of San Francisco.

Webster was killed by a train in Belmont, California on May 20, 1955. He was survived by seven children.
