= Jeanneret =

Jeanneret may refer to:

- Charles Jeanneret (1887–1965), Swiss-French architect better known as Le Corbusier
- Charles Jeanneret (politician) (1834–1898), Australian politician
- François Charles Archile Jeanneret (1890–1967), Canadian academic
- Gustave Jeanneret (1847–1927), Swiss painter
- Henri Jeanneret (1878–1935), Australian footballer
- Marie Jeanneret (1836–1884), Swiss serial killer
- Pauline Jeanneret (born 1987), French curler
- Pierre Jeanneret (1896–1967), Swiss architect, cousin of Le Corbusier
- Rick Jeanneret (born 1942), Canadian media personality
- Sébastien Jeanneret (born 1973), Swiss footballer
