= Zaïre. Revue Congolaise—Congoleesch Tijdschrift =

- Discipline: African studies, African history
- Language: English

Publication details
- Former name(s): Congo. Revue générale de la colonie Belge—Algemeen tijdschrift van de Belgische Kolonie
- History: –1961
- Frequency: Annually

Standard abbreviations
- ISO 4: Zaïre, Rev. Congo.—Congoleesch Tijdschr.

Zaïre. Revue Congolaise—Congoleesch Tijdschrift (Note: In later editions, the modern Dutch adjectival form "Congolees" is used instead of the archaic "Congoleesch" spelling.) (French and Dutch; in English: "Zaire. Congolese Review") was a Belgian academic journal devoted to African studies. In particular, it focused on the region of the Belgian colonial empire (modern-day D.R. Congo, Rwanda and Burundi).

The journal was published with both French and Dutch language articles. When it started in 1920, it was originally entitled Congo. Revue générale de la colonie Belge—Algemeen tijdschrift van de Belgische Kolonie (Congo. General Revue of the Belgian Colony). Ceasing publication during the German occupation of Belgium, it was revived in 1947 and the title was changed. It ceased publication in 1960, shortly after the independence of the Belgian Congo.

== History ==
The journal was originally published under the title Congo. Revue générale de la colonie Belge—Algemeen tijdschrift van de Belgische Kolonie (Congo. General Review of the Belgian Colony), first published in 1920. It was published privately in Brussels and was edited by Édouard De Jonghe. Articles were divided into six sections, including informative articles (often on ethnography), miscellaneous studies of broader phenomenon, studies on commerce and trade, and a detailed bibliography. It was issued jointly with the Bulletin de la Société Belge d'Études Coloniales (Bulletin of the Belgian Society of Colonial Studies). Congo ceased publication with the outbreak of World War II and the subsequent German occupation of Belgium. In 1947, it was replaced by Zaïre. Revue Congolaise-Congoleesch Tijdschrift. Zaïre was published in 14 volumes and last appeared in 1960.
