= Petrus Vertenten =

Belgian missionary

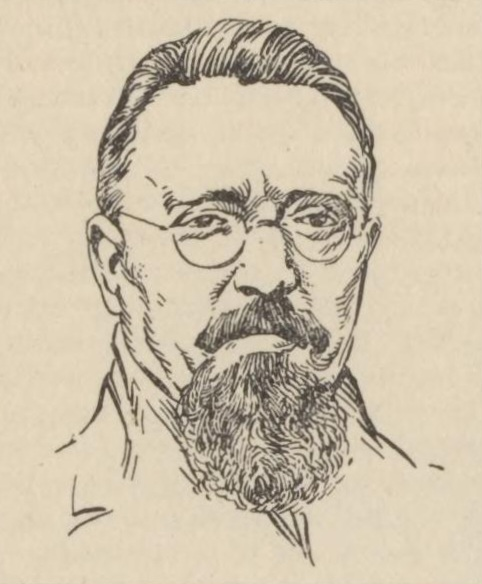
- Born: Petrus Vertenten; 1884; Belgium
- Died: 1946 (aged 61–62)
- Occupations: Painter, missionary and ethnologist

Petrus Vertenten (1884 – 1946) was a Belgian Missionary of the Sacred Heart in Dutch New Guinea.

Vertenten lived and worked on the south coast of Dutch New Guinea from 1910 to 1925 among the Marind-anim, a Papuan people in the wider area of Merauke, and can be described as an authority on knowledge about them. Vertenten later spent time in Belgian Congo, making ethnological researches in all places he visited. He was also a painter and a draftsman, producing perhaps the first colored portraits of a Papuan culture.

When the Marinds were risking extinction due to the spread of an imported venereal disease combined with their particular sexual practices, Vertenten repeatedly alerted the Dutch government in Merauke, and eventually got to speak to the governor-general in Batavia. He went down in history as "savior of the Kaja-Kaja's" and was appointed a Knight of the Order of Orange-Nassau for his efforts.

== Life and work ==
He was born in Hamme on 3 October 1884, to Hendrik and Clemence Van den Brande. Vertenten worked from 1910 to 1925 on the south coast of Dutch New Guinea among the Marind-anim, a Papuan people living in the area of Maurake, who at the time were notorious for their headhunting and peculiar sexually oriented rituals. The spread of an imported venereal disease, the granuloma venereum, led this population - partly due to its own ritual practices - almost to extinction. Father Vertenten repeatedly alerted the Dutch government in Merauke and eventually even got to speak to the governor-general in Batavia about this. As a result, a parliamentary debate was held in the Netherlands about the state of health in New Guinea. Vertenten succeeded and a squad of vaccinators and other medical personnel were deployed to save the Marind-anim from extinction. Vertenten went down in history as "savior of the Kaja-Kaja's" (Kaja-Kaja is an old-fashioned name for the Marind-anim) and was appointed a Knight of the Order of Orange-Nassau for his efforts.

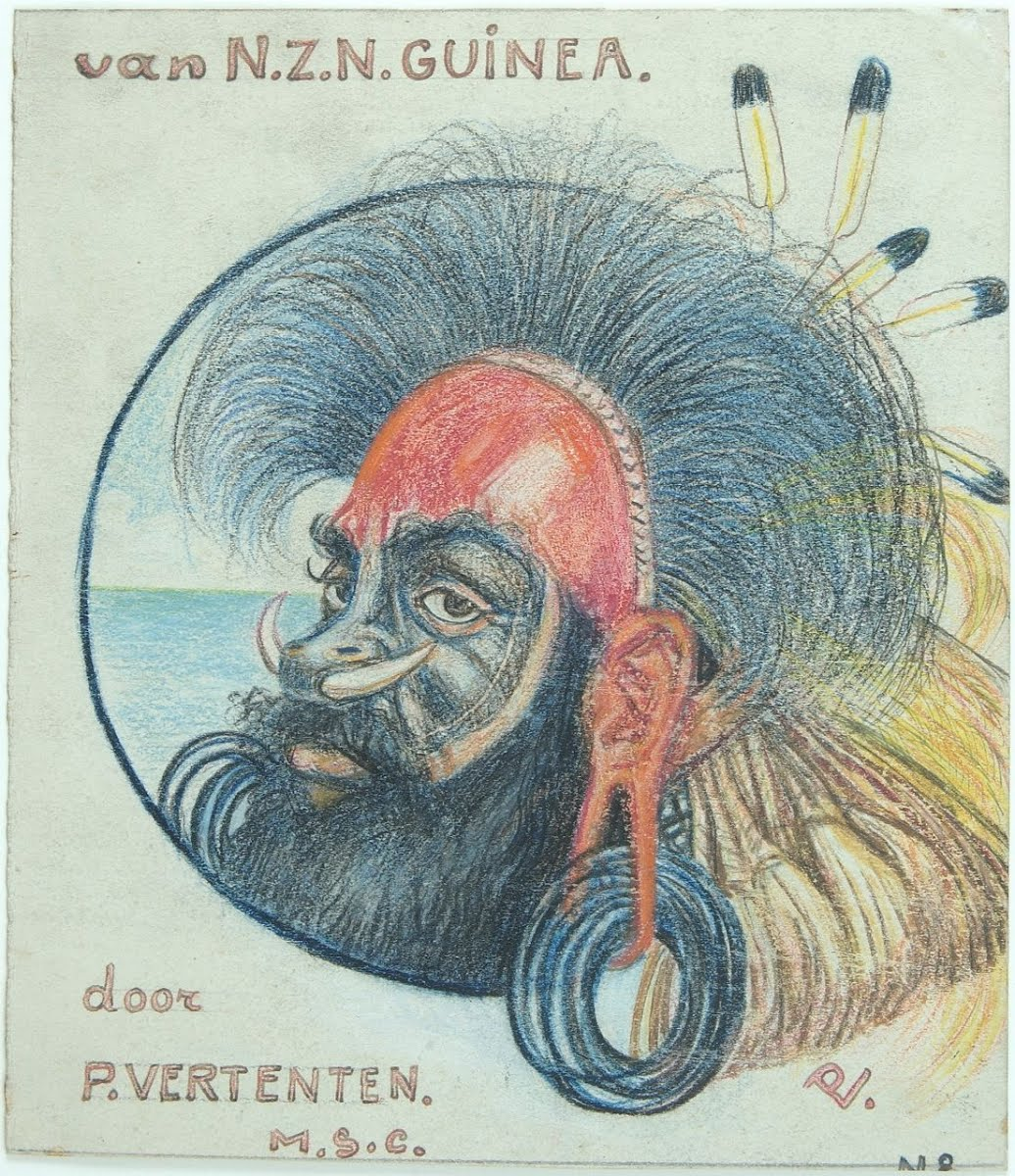
Portrait of a Marind man, Nationaal Museum van Wereldculturen, Amsterdam

From 1927 to 1939, Vertenten worked in the Belgian Congo, where he was based, among others places, in Coquilhatstad (now Mbandaka), where he also held higher missionary positions. His brother, missionary Louis Vertenten, also worked there. Father Vertenten spent the last years of his life in his native country. He died of pneumonia after being confined to bed by lumbago for years. A statue of him was unveiled in Hamme five years after Vertenten's death; a street is also named after him.

=== Ethnologist and painter ===
Vertenten was also a competent amateur ethnologist who wrote down his findings with great empathy for the cultures in which he had to immerse himself. He wrote hundreds of small articles in mission magazines, but also made more technical contributions in anthropological journals. His best known work is Fifteen Years with the Headhunters of Dutch South New Guinea (Vijftien jaar bij de koppensnellers van Nederlandsch Zuid-Nieuw-Guinea). In addition, Vertenten was a creditable draftsman and painter. He made many sketches and portrait studies in both New Guinea and Congo. His oil paintings and crayons of the Marind-anim men and women, whether or not in full ritual attire, are perhaps the first full-color representations of a Papuan culture. After his death, a large part of his oeuvre, as well as a meticulously maintained archive, were preserved in the mission house in Borgerhout, where Vertenten's career had started. In 2001 this estate was taken over by the Tropenmuseum in Amsterdam, where a number of the paintings can be seen in the semi-permanent exhibition. The archive was moved to the Catholic Documentation Center (Katholiek Documentatie Centrum) of Radboud University Nijmegen.
