= Abel Bergaigne =

Abel Henri Joseph Bergaigne
- Born: 31 August 1838; Vimy, Pas-de-Calais
- Died: 6 August 1888 (aged 49)
- Occupation: Indologist

Abel Henri Joseph Bergaigne (31 August 1838 – 6 August 1888) was a French Indologist and scholar of Sanskrit. He wrote a number of books related to religion and philosophy. He published the beginning of a study on grammatical construction, which is regarded for its historical development. Languages included Sanskrit, Greek, Latin, Germanic languages and others.

== Biography ==
Born in Vimy, Pas-de-Calais, on 31 August 1838. After his father, he took a job in Registration service; however, his rising interest in literature and science led him to abandon the job.

In 1867, Bergaigne became a coach in Sanskrit. By 1877, he became a lecturer in Sorbonne, and in 1885, he was appointed as a professor of Sanskrit and comparative linguistic. Apart from Vedas, he had also translated Bhagavada Gita.

He died on 6 August 1888.

== Legacy ==
His interpretation of Rigveda brought him worldwide fame. He was regarded as the leading Orientalist of France for his period. His work has influenced people such as Sylvain Lévi, Paul Mus, and others.

One review described his book La Religion Védique D'après Les Hymnes Du Rig-Veda as "an acute, careful, and comprehensive work by an able scholar."

== Notable works ==
- La Religion Védique D'après Les Hymnes Du Rig-Veda, 1878
- Inscriptions sanscrites du Cambodge, 1882
- La division en adhyayas du Rig-Veda, 1888
