= R. E. Dennett =

Richard Edward Dennett was an English trader operating out of the Kongo (present day Republic of Congo) in the early 20th century who wrote a number of books that were influential on sociological and anthropological research on the cultures of West Africa.

== Bibliography ==
- Seven years among the Fjort; Being an English trader's experiences in the Congo district (S. Low, Marston, Searle, & Rivington, 1887)
- At the Back of the Black Man's Mind; Or, Notes on the kingly office in West Africa (Cass library of African studies, 1906)
- Nigerian studies; Or, The religious and political system of the Yoruba (Cass library of African studies, 1910)
- My Yoruba alphabet (Macmillan, 1916)
- Notes on the Folklore of the Fjort (French Congo) (Publications of the Folklore Society. 41, 1967)
- "The Congo: from a trader's point of view," Journal of the Manchester Geographical Society, 1886, pp. 283–306.
- "From Banana, at the Mouth of the Congo, to Boma; etc. [Letters by R.E. Dennet]," Journal of the Manchester Geographical Society, 1887, pp. 112–23.
- "The Fjort: the Manners and Customs of the native Congo People," The Journal of the Manchester Geographical Society, 1890, 1, pp. 26–29.
- "Death and Burial of the Fiote," Folklore, 8, 1897, pp. 132–137.
- "Laws and Customs of the Fjort or Bavili Family, Kingdom of Loango," Journal of the African Society, 3, April 1902, pp. 259–87.
- "The religion of the Fjort or Fiote: 'Mavungu'," Journal of the African Society, 1901–02, pp. 452–54.
- "King Maluango's Court," Journal of the African Society, 1903–04, pp. 154–58.
- "The Court of the Slave Mamboma," Journal of the African Society, 1903–04, pp. 159–62.
- "A few Notes on the History of Loango (Northern Portion of Congo Coast)," Journal of the African Society, 1903–04, pp. 277–80.
- "Bavili Notes," Folklore, 16, 1905, pp. 371–406.
