= Sudan Notes and Records =

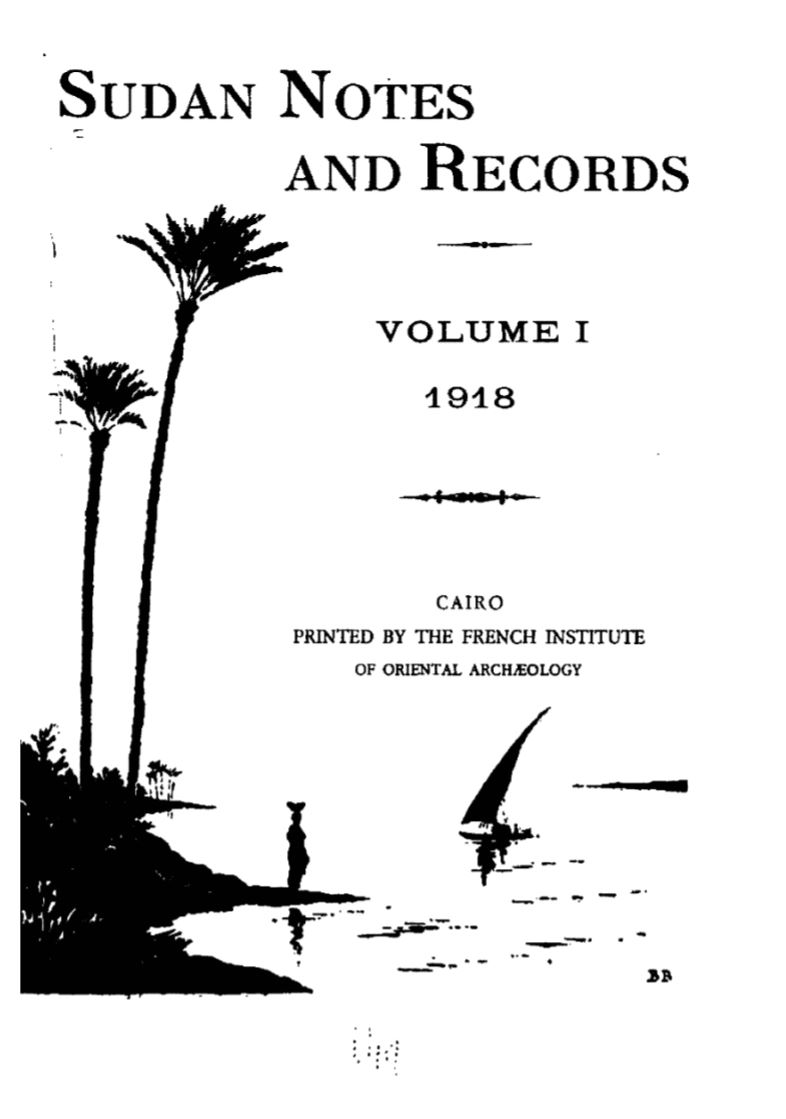
- Language: English, Arabic

Publication details
- Publisher: Institut Francois d'Archeologie Orientale, Cairo (1918-1920); Sudan Printing Press, Khartoum (1920-1922); Hadarat al-Sudan Press (Sudan)
- Frequency: Quarterly (1918-1920), Biannually (1921-1999)

Standard abbreviations
- ISO 4: Sudan Notes Rec.

Indexing
- ISSN: 0375-2984
- OCLC no.: 1730412

Sudan Notes & Records (SNR) (Sūdān fī dafātir wa-mudawwanāt) was a quarterly scholarly journal on Sudanese studies established in 1918 by the British administration of the Anglo-Egyptian Sudan.

== History ==
Sudan Notes and Records was founded in 1918. Until 1952, it was the only regularly-published journal in the Anglo-Egyptian Sudan. (Note: During the 1930s, the first generation of Sudanese graduates from the Gordon Memorial College founded journals partly in response. These include al-Fajr (established 1934) and al-Nahda (established 1930). See O'Fahey, R.S. (1999). "On the Promotion of Sudanese Cultural and Historical Studies: A Note and a Proposal" (PDF). Sudan Studies. 23: 2–8.) The idea for the journal was suggested by the Director of Survey, Lt. Col. Milo Talbot, to Edgar Bonham-Carter (later Sir), then the Legal Secretary of the Sudan government. Talbot felt that "year by year much valuable information was lost or buried in inaccessible files because there was no convenient medium for recording it in the country." This was a problem that might be corrected with a journal. Bonham-Carter took the proposal to J.W. Crowfoot, the Director of the Education Department, and a meeting chaired by Sir Lee Stack was held where it was decided to start a journal. Stack became the Journal's patron. After the death of Stack, Geoffrey Archer took on the role of patron.

A committee was formed to address the problems of printing, financing, and finding contributors. This "General Committee" was composed of thirteen men, with an editorial committee made up of J. W. Crowfoot and Wasey Sterry as chairman and vice-chairman, and R. Wedd, the secretary and treasurer. The General Committee also included two members of the military, two physicians, and members of the Sudan Political Service. Early on, the Journal published the ethnographic observations of British district officials, whose interest in social anthropology and ethnology was encouraged by their need to find out about the people that they administered. SNR also regularly published papers on linguistics, archaeology, agricultural practices, the navigability or rivers (and edibility of their fish), the histories of towns and places, big game hunting, sport and a miscellany of other topics. These papers were written by colonial officials, anthropologists, missionaries, doctors, and others. Later on, Sudanese contributed.

Sudan Notes and Records was published in Cairo until 1920, when in a cost saving measure the Sudan Press in Khartoum was tasked with its publication.
