= Héli Chatelain =

Swiss linguist and Protestant missionary

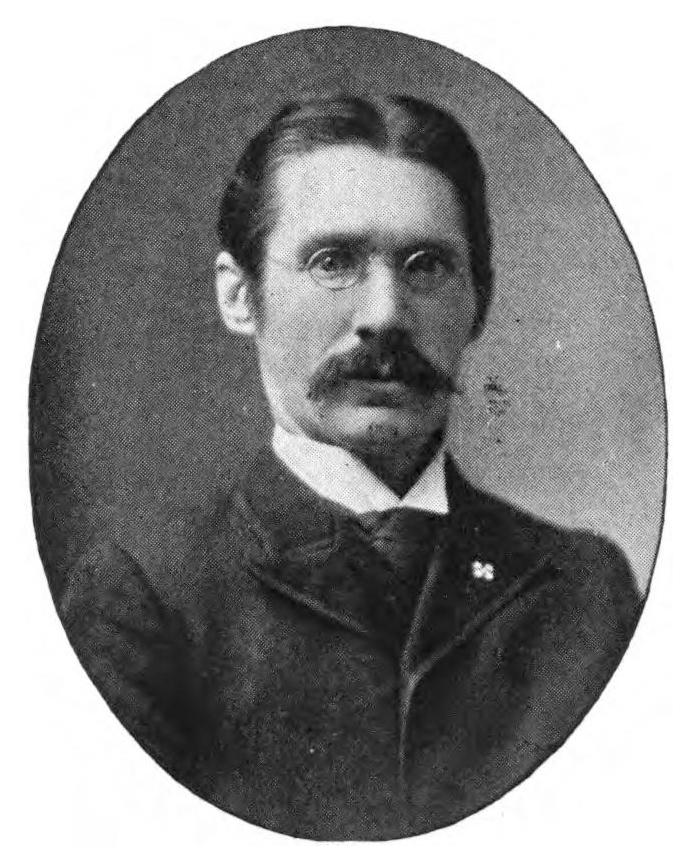
- from "Africa and the American Negro" 1896
- Born: April 29, 1859; Murten, Switzerland
- Died: July 22, 1908 (aged 49); Lausanne, Switzerland
- Occupations: linguist, missionary
- Notable work: Folk-tales of Angola; fifty tales with Kimbundu text, liberal English translation, introduction, and notes.

Héli Chatelain (Murten, April 29, 1859 – Lausanne, July 22, 1908) was a Swiss linguist and Protestant missionary. He worked with rural populations in Angola, where he founded a mission and, in particular, fought against the slavery that still ravaged the country in the 19th century.

== Biography ==
Héli Chatelain was born in Murten in 1859, into a family of watchmakers from the canton of Jura. Severely disabled from birth, he could not move without the aid of two canes. He turned to reading and the study of languages, as well as the study of the Bible and theology. He spent several years in Lausanne, then in Angola, where he discovered the world of religious missions and colonial trade. He then moved to the United States in the New York area. In 1896, he founded the "Philafrican League," which aimed to establish missions on the African continent and protect fugitive slaves.

In 1897, he returned to Angola to found the Lincoln mission in Caluquembe. He studied Kimbundu, a local language of which he published a grammar. In 1907, he returned to Switzerland, where he died a year later.

== Missionary work ==
Inspired by the stories of explorer and evangelist David Livingstone, as well as the anti-slavery action of American president Abraham Lincoln, Chatelain strove to fight against slavery that was still present in Angola at the end of the 19th century.

In 1961, the Swiss newspaper L'Impartial, published in La Chaux-de-Fonds, recalled the importance of Chatelain's work:

(In Angola), missions have accomplished considerable work. Although the bulk of the effort was carried out by Anglo-Saxon missions, it is necessary to remind the French-speaking Swiss public of the part taken in this task by the Philafrican Mission founded in 1897 by Héli Chatelain, from Tramelan.
