= Stefan Lehner =

Swiss artist (born 1957)

- Born: 1957 (age 68–69); St. Gallen, Switzerland
- Occupation: Designer

Stefan Lehner (born 1957 in St. Gallen, Switzerland) is a Swiss designer who lives and works in Utrecht, Netherlands. He studied Philosophy, Mathematics, Language and Communication Coach in Enterprises.

From 1978–2004 he lived and worked in Fribourg, Switzerland, and also studied philosophy, mathematics, language and Communication Coach in Enterprises, and was member of the Committee of the Art Laboratory Belluard Bollwerk International.

== Design career ==
His career as a designer started in 1986, with the first construction of a metal furniture's based on recycled materials from the industry. In 1988 he founded the Atelier En-Fer and work with Cristina Lanzos until 1999. In 2004 he transferred the Atelier En-Fer to the old town of Utrecht, The Netherlands.

The peculiar characteristic of his work is that the furniture, objects and interiors are based on used materials and reuse former or hidden functions of the recycled materials. The transformations are made with complex materials (industry), but also with cheap trash (packaging). The metamorphose of the materials should be useful and comfortable, surprising and make smile. His projects bring to the houses the sober beauty of industrial objects but simultaneously take profits from their former function: a spring damps weights (banc, office chair), a car seat has a good ergonomics (arm chair, sofa, reception room), a chain tracks and stays flexible (arm chair, bed, couch) and a supermarket trolley rolls and can be pushed together for storage (seat, child car, coat rack). The main topics related to his work are: research recycling and function reuse (studies and constructions re-using functions in new objects), furniture prototypes (authentic materials for personalised use), interior design, international projects (collaboration with designers and artists in Brazil).

== Fascination for inventions and industrial materials ==
As a child he was always drawing and inventing machines and collected a lot of thrown objects. Since this time he has visited scrap yards and factories and collected interesting used materials. Searching for a new life for those objects, he started in 1985 with the construction of furniture prototypes. These principles are also applied for bigger installations: kitchen (Spain, Switzerland), bathroom (Spain), bar (Fribourg), reception (Bern), office (Fribourg), jewellery shop (Zurich), flower shop (Fribourg). Serial production and new row materials - For Chesterfield he developed a recycling ashtray and produced 1001 pieces for sponsored trendy restaurants, bars and concert rooms. Later he started to use also other recycled row materials in combination with metals: rubber, wood, glass and animal bones.

== Exhibitions ==
Personal Expositions

- 2006 - Personal Exposition in the Sociale Verzakeringsbank Amstelveen
- 1999 - Designshop „Einzigart“ in Zürich
- 1992 - Forum d’Art Contemporain in Siders
- 1990 - Galerie Delikt in Freiburg

Group expositions

- 2006 - 100%design Rotterdam
- 2006 - Woonbeurs Amsterdam
- 2003 - “Sägerei“ on the Belpberg
- 2002 - “Stock“ in Fribourg
- 2000 - Form Forum Switzerland in Basel
- 1999 - Usine, CAC et EAS in Siders
- 1999 - Form Forum Switzerland in Basel
- 1998 - Usine Vuille in Fribourg
- 1996 - Craft Council Switzerland in Bern
- 1995 - Jung Economic Chamber in Montreux
- 1992 - „Das bessere Produkt“ in Rüschlikon
- 1992 - Neuchâtel Art

Projects for enterprises and artists

- 2006 - Interior Design for Imagemakers Rotterdam
- 2001 - Lighting, tools and showcase for flower shop Hertig in Fribourg
- 2000 - Furnishing for jewellery shop Riekmann in Zürich
- 2000 - Set design for “Théatre de l’Ecroux”
- 1998 - Video room for Geneva Fair representing the Canton Fribourg
- 1997 - Office design for Cantonal administration
- 1997 - Scene Lighting for Music Club “Temps Moderne“ in Vevey
- 1996 - Sponsor objects for Marlboro and Chesterfield
- 1995 - 1001 ashtrays for Chesterfield
- 1995 - Set design for Dance Performance of “Da Motus!”
- 1993 - Bar for Music Club Fri-Son in Fribourg
- 1992 - Set design for Dance Performance of “Da Motus!”
- 1991 - Reception for Trimedia Bern

== Prizes ==
- 1996 - 1st Prize: Art Competition for new building of the Engineer
- 1989 - 1st and 3rd Prize: Plum’art in Fribourg
- 1987 - Special prize: Tabl’art in Fribourg
- 1986 - 1st Prize: Tabl’art in Fribourg
