= Gerhard Lindblom =

Swedish ethnographer (1887–1969)

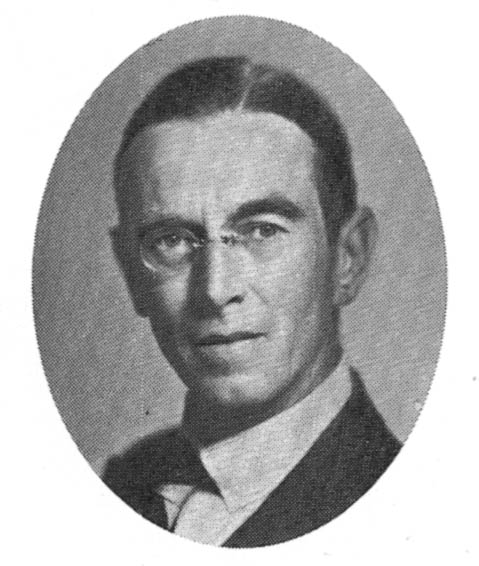
Gerhard Lindblom

Karl Gerhard Lindblom (26 August 1887 – 8 June 1969) was an ethnographer from Sweden who worked in East Africa in the 1910s. He was the principal author of materials on the Akamba peoples. Additionally, he worked as the Director of the Museum of Stockholm beginning in 1928 and in 1935 he became a professor at the Stockholm University.

== Bibliography ==
- Outlines of a Tharaka Grammar, with a list of words and specimens of the language, 1914
- The Akamba in British East Africa: an ethnological monograph, 1916, PhD dissertation at Uppsala University, Sweden, 2nd edition, enlarged, 1918–1920, facsimile 1969
- Notes on Kamba grammar: with two appendices: Kamba names of persons, places, animals and plants - salutations, 1926
- Die Beschneidung bei den Akamba, 1927
- Die Schleuder in Afrika und Anderwärts, 1927
- Fighting-bracelets and Kindred Weapons in Africa, 1927
- The Use of Stilts: especially in Africa and America, 1927
- Further notes on the use of stilts, 1928
- Kamba folklore, 3 volumes, 1928-1935
- String figures in Africa, 1930
- The use of oxen as pack riding animals in Africa, 1931
- Notes ethnographiques sur le Kavirondo septentrional et la colonie du Kenya, 1932
- Spears and staffs with two or more points, in Africa, 1937
- Wire-drawing, especially in Africa, 1939
- Ethnological and anthropological studies in Sweden during the war, 194
