= Bijdragen tot de Taal-, Land- en Volkenkunde =

- Discipline: Southeast Asian studies
- Language: Dutch, English
- Edited by: Freek Colombijn

Publication details
- Former names: Bijdragen tot de taal-, land- en volkenkunde van Nederlandsch-Indië
- History: 1853–present
- Publisher: Brill Publishers (Netherlands)
- Frequency: Quarterly

Standard abbreviations
- ISO 4: Bijdr. Taal- Land- Volkenkd.

Indexing
- CODEN: BTTVE2
- ISSN: 0006-2294
- LCCN: sn86000287
- OCLC no.: 715439108

Links
- Website and online archive

Bijdragen tot de Taal-, Land- en Volkenkunde (English title: Journal of the Humanities and Social Sciences of Southeast Asia and Oceania) also known by the abbreviated name BKI (Bijdragen Koninklijk Instituut), is a peer reviewed academic journal on Southeast Asia and Indonesia that was established in 1853 and was published by the Royal Netherlands Institute of Southeast Asian and Caribbean Studies. It was published as Bijdragen tot de taal-, land- en volkenkunde van Nederlandsch-Indië (ISSN 1383-5408) between 1853 and 1948. The journal focuses in particular on linguistics, anthropology, and history of Southeast Asia, and more specifically of Indonesia. It appears quarterly, running a total of roughly 600 pages annually. The editor-in-chief is Freek Colombijn (Vrije Universiteit).

Brill acquired the journal in 2012.

== See also ==
- Open access in the Netherlands
