= John Leighton Wilson =

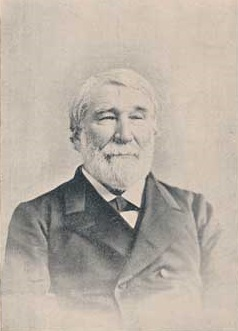
Photograph of Leighton Wilson published in Memoirs of Rev. John Leighton Wilson, missionary to Africa and Secretary of Foreign Missions (1895) by Hampden Coit DuBose.

John Leighton Wilson (1809-1885), an alumnus of Columbia Theological Seminary, and his wife Jane Bayard Wilson were the first missionaries to West Africa sent by the American Board of Commissioners for Foreign Missions.

== Life ==
Leighton Wilson was born in Sumter, S.C on March 25, 1809. He graduated from Union College, NY in 1829 and Columbia Theological Seminary in 1833. In the fall of 1833 he sailed to West Africa to identify for the American Board of Commissioners for Foreign Missions (located in Boston) the best location for the Board’s first mission in West Africa. Cape Palmas, Liberia, was chosen for work among the Grebo people. Returning to the U.S. in 1834, he married Mary Elizabeth Bayard of Savannah, a daughter of a wealthy and aristocratic family. They sailed for Cape Palmas the fall of that year. During the next seven years they established schools for the Grebo, developed a Grebo alphabet, wrote the first Grebo dictionary and grammar, and translated into Grebo not only portions of the Bible but also school books and hymns. These were printed by their African American missionary colleague B. V. R. James. The Wilsons freed their inherited slaves, provided for their transportation to Cape Palmas and helped them to become established in the African American settler community at the Cape.

While at Cape Palmas, Leighton Wilson wrote copious reports about Grebo culture and challenged white stereotypes of Africans. He vigorously opposed the international slave trade and was often quoted in William Lloyd Garrison’s abolitionist paper The Liberator. Conflict between the African American settlers and the Grebo led the Wilsons to conclude reluctantly that African American colonization in Liberia was, like white colonization in South Africa, an act of imperialism. They came to regret helping their freed slaves come to the Cape, thinking that New England would have been a better place for them to start a new life of freedom. Leighton Wilson began to compare the African American settlers to whites in Georgia who were taking the land of the Cherokees.

In 1842, the Wilsons and their colleagues with the American Board turned over their work to a nearby Episcopal mission and moved to Gabon. They had concluded that the conflict between the settlers and the Grebo was too disruptive for the work of the mission. A number of Grebo who had been converted and who had completed their education at the mission school went with them to be teachers in Gabon. A new mission was established at Baraka, near present day Libreville, Gabon, among the Mpongwe people. Schools were quickly established in various towns and villages around the Gabon estuary. An alphabet for the Mpongwe language was soon developed and once again Leighton Wilson wrote a dictionary and grammar of the indigenous language. He translated portions of the New Testament into Mpongwe. When the French began to occupy the estuary, the Wilsons and the other American missionaries supported the Mpongwe in their attempt to resist the imperialism of the French. On one occasion a French naval vessel bombarded the mission at Baraka trying to intimate the missionaries. When American naval ships arrived in the estuary, the French apologized for the bombardment and a serious international incident was avoided.

On a visit to the U.S. in 1848, Leighton Wilson took with him a skeleton of a large ape never before seen by whites. a Harved professor named this ape "gorilla", and his description of it encouraged a growing scientific racism.

Ill health forced the Wilsons to return to the U.S. in 1852. Shortly after he was elected Secretary for the Presbyterian Board of Foreign Missions located in New York. They purchased a large home in the city and over the next eight years welcomed to it many missionaries and recent converts from various mission fields. In 1856 Wilson’s book Western Africa was published by Harper and Brothers. A careful and appreciative study of West African cultures and societies, the book still serves as an early resource for anthropologists and historians of West Africa.

As the Civil War approached, the Wilsons felt a growing tension. They heard the siren voice of their Southern homeland calling from deep within their memories. They sought to resist its seductions, but the call became more insistent and, finally, irresistible. In spite of their years of fighting slavery, they gave themselves to a history and a people committed to maintaining slavery and its deep oppression—both an act of deep love for a place and people, and the desertion of a moral vision. Wilson was soon made the Secretary for Foreign Missions for the newly formed Southern Presbyterian Church. After the Civil War he directed a growing mission movement by Southern Presbyterians. He died in 1885 in the plantation home where he had been born.
