= Breaking the Spell (Dennett book) =

2006 book by Daniel C. Dennett

- Author: Daniel C. Dennett
- Language: English
- Subject: Psychology of religion
- Publisher: Viking (Penguin)
- Publication date: 2006
- Publication place: United States
- Media type: Print
- ISBN: 978-0-14-303833-7
- Dewey Decimal: 200 22
- LC Class: BL2775.3 .D46 2006
- Preceded by: Sweet Dreams

Breaking the Spell: Religion as a Natural Phenomenon is a 2006 book by American philosopher and cognitive scientist Daniel Dennett, in which the author argues that religion is in need of scientific analysis so that its nature and future may be better understood. For Dennett the "spell" that requires "breaking" is not religious belief itself but the belief that it is off-limits to or beyond scientific inquiry.

== Synopsis ==
The book is divided into three parts. Dennett's working definition of religions is: "social systems whose participants avow belief in a supernatural agent or agents whose approval is to be sought". He notes that this definition is "a place to start, not something carved in stone".

Part I discusses the motivation and justification for the entire project: Can science study religion? Should science study religion? Dennett addresses the proposal by Stephen Jay Gould that science and religion represent non-overlapping magisteria (NOMA); science dealing with facts while religion deals with values, morality, and personal meanings. Noting that NOMA drew few adherents from either side, and that Gould's thesis is itself based upon a scientific view of the issues, Dennett concludes that religion must be open to scientific investigation.

Part II proceeds to use the tools of evolutionary biology and memetics to suggest possible theories regarding the origin of religion and subsequent evolution of modern religions from ancient folk beliefs.

Part III analyzes religion and its effects in today's world: Does religion make us moral? Is religion what gives meaning to life? What should we teach the children? Dennett bases much of his analysis on empirical evidence, though he often points out that much more research in this field is needed.

== Critical reception ==
=== Mass media ===
The Guardian's Andrew Brown describes it as giving "a very forceful and lucid account of the reasons why we need to study religious behaviour as a human phenomenon".

In Scientific American, George Johnson describes the book's main draw as being "a sharp synthesis of a library of evolutionary, anthropological and psychological research on the origin and spread of religion".

=== Biological sciences ===
In The New Yorker, evolutionary biologist H. Allen Orr described the book as "an accessible account of what might be called the natural history of religion".

=== Religious community ===
Leon Wieseltier, former member of the editorial board of the Jewish Review of Books, called the book, in The New York Times, "a sorry instance of present-day scientism" which he labels a superstition.

Charles T. Rubin, professor emeritus of political science at Duquesne University of the Holy Spirit, likened Dennett to "a tone-deaf music scholar", criticized his "unwillingness to admit the limits of scientific rationality" and accused him of "deploying the same old Enlightenment tropes that didn't work all that well the first time around".

=== Philosophical ===
Edward Feser and Karlyn Bowman criticize his interpretation of theistic arguments, whilst maintaining praise for his passages on cognitive neuroscience.

Roger Scruton both praised and criticised Dennett's book in his book On Human Nature, endorsing his intellectual bravery and imaginative writing, yet criticising his reliance on the meme theory, and remaining sceptical of his view that all areas of human consciousness can be accessible through the neo-Darwinian human model alone.

Philosopher and theologian David B. Hart finds Dennett to be dogmatic, a "Darwinian fundamentalist".

=== Social sciences ===
Sociologist Penny Edgell (U. of Minnesota), who specializes in morals and religion, find the book frustrating in its combination of worthy scholarship and polemics.

=== Other disciplines ===
In The New York Review of Books, Freeman Dyson wrote:

After Dennett's harsh depiction of the moral evils associated with religion, his last chapter, "Now What Do We Do?," is bland and conciliatory. "So, in the end," he says, "my central policy recommendation is that we gently, firmly educate the people of the world, so that they can make truly informed choices about their lives." This recommendation sounds harmless enough. Why can we not all agree with it? Unfortunately, it conceals fundamental disagreements. To give the recommendation a concrete meaning, the meaning of the little word "we" must be specified. Who are the "we" who are to educate the people of the world? At stake is the political control of religious education, the most contentious of all the issues that religion poses to modern societies. "We" might be the parents of the children to be educated, or a local school board, or a national ministry of education, or a legally established ecclesiastical authority, or an international group of philosophers sharing Dennett's views. Of all these possibilities, the last is the least likely to be implemented. Dennett's recommendation leaves the practical problems of regulating religious education unsolved. Until we can agree about the meaning of "we," the recommendation to "gently, firmly educate the people of the world" will only cause further dissension between religious believers and well-meaning philosophers.

== Translations ==
Breaking the Spell has been translated into several other languages, including:

Dutch	De betovering van het geloof: religie als een natuurlijk fenomeen	Hans Bosman	Amsterdam: Contact 2006	ISBN 9025426875
Finnish	Lumous murtuu: uskonto luonnonilmiönä	Kimmo Pietiläinen	Helsinki: Terra Cognita 2007	ISBN 978-952-5202-96-0
German	Den Bann brechen. Religion als natürliches Phänomen	Frank Born	Frankfurt a. M.: Verlag der Weltreligionen im Insel Verlag 2008	ISBN 978-3-458-71011-0
Greek	Απομυθοποίηση	Dimitris Xygalatas; Nikolas Roubekas	Thessaloniki: Vanias 2007	ISBN 978-960-288-198-9
Indonesian	Breaking the Spell. Agama sebagai Fenomena Alam	Ninus D. Andarnuswari	Jakarta: Kepustakaan Populer Gramedia 2021	ISBN 978-602-481-519-6
Italian	Rompere l'incantesimo. La religione come fenomeno naturale	S. Levi	Milano: Cortina Raffaello 2007	ISBN 978-88-6030-097-3
Polish	Odczarowanie. Religia jako zjawisko naturalne	Barbara Stanosz	Warsaw: Państwowy Instytut; Wydawniczy 2008	ISBN 978-83-06-03138-6
Portuguese	Quebrando O Encanto. A Religião Como Fenômeno Natural	Helena Londres	Rio de Janeiro: Globo 2006	ISBN 978-85-250-4288-0
Serbian	Razbijanje čarolije: religija kao prirodna pojava	Milan Perić	Belgrade: McMillan 2015	ISBN 978-86-80328-01-0
Spanish	Romper el hechizo: la religión como un fenómeno natural	Felipe de Brigard	Madrid: Katz 2007	ISBN 978-84-96859-00-5
Persian	شکستن طلسم: دین به عنوان پدیده ای طبیعی	Amir Maniee	Published online, 2019

== See also ==
- Religious studies
- Evolutionary psychology of religion
  - Similar / related books: Religion Explained
  - Darwin's Cathedral
  - The End of Faith
  - The God Delusion
  - God is Not Great
