= T. K. Oommen =

Indian sociologist (1937–2026)

- Born: 16 October 1937; Venmony, Alappuzha, Travancore, India
- Died: 26 February 2026 (aged 88); Gurgaon, Haryana, India
- Education: Kerala University
- Occupations: Sociologist, teacher, author
- Awards: Padma Bhushan; V. K. R. V. Rao Prize; G. S. Ghurye Award; Swami Pranavananda Award; Mar Chrysostom Navathy Award

Tharailath Koshy Oommen (16 October 1937 – 26 February 2026) was an Indian sociologist, author, teacher and professor emeritus at the Centre for the Study of Social Systems, Jawaharlal Nehru University. He was awarded Padma Bhushan, the third highest Indian civilian award in 2008 for his services to the fields of education and literature, by the president of India.

Oommen was the 12th president of International Sociological Association (1990–1994).

== Background ==
T. K. Oommen was born on 16 October 1937, the second son to Saramma and Koshy of the Keerikattu family at Tharailath, Venmony, Alleppey, Travancore. After early schooling in Alappuzha, Oommen obtained his BA in economics from Kerala University, Thiruvananthapuram in 1957 and MA in sociology from Pune University in 1960. He continued at Pune University for his doctoral research and obtained PhD in 1965 on Charisma, stability and change: an analysis of Bhoodan-Gramdan movement in India under the supervision of Prof. Y. B. Damle.

Oommen resided at The National Media Campus in Haryana. He died on 26 February 2026, at the age of 88.

== Career ==
Oommen started his career as a lecturer in Social Sciences at Delhi School of Social Work, Delhi University (1964–70) where he worked as the Reader in Sociology (1970–71). He then moved to the Centre for the Study of Social Systems (CSSS), Jawaharlal Nehru University as Associate Professor (1971–76) and later became the Professor of Sociology (1976–2002).

During 2003–2006, he was involved with the following projects:

- He was the chairman of the Advisory Committee, Gujarat Harmony Project, to explore the possibility of reconciliation between Hindus and Muslims after the 2002 communal carnage in Gujarat.
- He was a member of the Prime Minister's High Level Committee, to study the Social, Economic and Educational Status of the Muslim Community of India, popularly known as the Sachar Committee.
- He held the chairmanship of Ford Foundation on Non-traditional Security.

In 2007, he was made professor emeritus at Jawaharlal Nehru University.

== Positions held ==
T. K. Oommen held various positions at International Sociological Association during the period 1986 to 1994. He was the association's first president from the Global South.

- 1986 Secretary General, XI World Congress of Sociology, New Delhi
- 1986–90 EC member
- 1990–94 president (the only person from Asia and Africa to hold the post)

He also held other positions during his career:

- Treasurer, Indian Sociological Society, 1975–78
- Secretary, Indian Sociological Society, 1989–91
- Editor, Sociological Bulletin, official organ of the Indian Sociological Society, 1975–8, 1989–1991, 1998–1999
- President, Indian Sociological Society, 1998–99
- Member, board of directors, International Institute of Sociology, Rome, 2001–2005
- Council Member, International Association for the Scientific Study of Religion, 1989–91 and 1993–95
- Vice-chair, Church and Society, World Council of Churches, Geneva, 1984–89
- Member, Indian National Commission for UNESCO, 1993–97

Oommen was also U.G.C. National Lecturer in Sociology, 1985–86, visiting professor, Dept. of Sociology, University of California (Berkeley), USA., Fall, 1990, visiting professor, Maison des Sciences de L'homme, Paris, June–July 1992, visiting professor, Wissenshaftszentrum, Berlin, May–July 1993 and June 1994, visiting fellow, Research School of Social Science, Australian National University, Canberra, December 1993 and senior visiting fellow, Institute of Advanced Studies, Budapest, October 1994 – July 1995. In the Spring of 1998, he was a fellow at the Swedish Collegium for Advanced Study in Uppsala, Sweden.

== Awards and recognition ==
Oommen received many awards for his services to the social milieu.

- V. K. R. V. Rao Prize in Sociology for 1981 by the Indian Council of Social Science Research
- G. S. Ghurye Award for 1985 by Bombay University, Mumbai
- Swami Pranavananda Award in Sociology, 1997 by University Grants Commission, New Delhi, India
- Fellow, the Swedish Collegium for Advanced Study in the Social Sciences, Uppsala, Sweden January–June 1998
- Philipose Mar Chrysostom Navathy Award for Excellence, 2007
- Padma Bhushan by the President of India in 2008

== Books and publications ==
- Oommen, T. K. (1972). Charisma, Stability and Change. Thompson Press.
- Oommen, T. K. (1978). Doctors and Nurses: A Study in Occupational Role Structures. Macmillan. ISBN 9780836402582.
- Oommen, T. K. (1984). Social Transformation in Rural India: Mobilization and State Intervention. Stosius Inc/Advent Books Division. ISBN 978-0706924763.
- Oommen, T. K. (1985). From Mobilization To Institutionalization: The Dynamics of Agrarian Movement In Kerala. Sangam Books. ISBN 978-0861321117.
- Oommen, T. K. (1986). Insiders and outsiders in India: primordial collectivism and cultural pluralism in nation-building. International Sociology.
- Oommen, T. K. (1988). The nature of sociological research and practice worldwide: a perspective from India. International Sociology.
- Oommen, T. K. (1990). Protest and change: Studies in social movements. Sage. ISBN 978-8170361985.
- Oommen, T. K. (1990). Sociology for one world: a plea for an authentic sociology. Sociological Bulletin. ISBN 978-0-19-809046-5.
- Oommen, T. K. (1991). Internationalization of sociology: a view from developing countries. Current Sociology.
- Oommen, T. K. (1995). Contested boundaries and emerging pluralism. International Sociology.
- Oommen, T. K. (1995). Alien Concepts and South Asian Reality: Responses and Reformulations. Sage. ISBN 978-0803992047.
- Oommen, T. K. (1997). Citizenship, Nationality and Ethnicity: Reconciling Competing Identities. Polity Press. ISBN 978-0745616209.
- Oommen, T. K. (1997). Citizenship and National Identity. Sage. ISBN 978-0803993587.
- Oommen, T. K. (2000). The Christian Clergy in India: Volume 1: Social Structure and Social Roles. Sage. ISBN 978-0761994183.
- Oommen, T. K. (2002). Pluralism, Equality and Identity: Comparative Studies. Oxford University Press. ISBN 978-0195657760.
- Oommen, T. K. (2004). Development Discourse: Issues and Concerns. Regency Publications. ASIN B002A9RLX8.
- Oommen, T. K. (2004). Nation, Civil Society and Social Movements. Sage. ISBN 978-8178292984.
- Oommen, T. K. (2005). Crisis and Contention in Indian Society. Sage. ISBN 978-0761933588.
- Oommen, T. K. (2005). Understanding Security: A New Perspective. Palgrave MacMillan. ISBN 978-1403929426.
- Oommen, T. K. (2007). Knowledge and Society: Situating Sociology and Social Anthropology. Oxford U Press. ISBN 9780198090465.
- Oommen, T. K. (2008). Reconciliation in Post-Godhra Gujarat. Pearson Education India. ASIN B008X5P1J4.
- Oommen, T. K. (2013). Knowledge and Society: Situating Sociology and Social Anthropology (Collected Essays). Oxford University Press. ISBN 978-0198090465.
