= Pascal Boyer =

French anthropologist

- Occupations: Cognitive anthropologist; evolutionary psychologist
- Title: Henry Luce Professor of Individual and Collective Memory

Academic background
- Education: University of Paris; St John's College, Cambridge

Academic work
- Institutions: Washington University in St. Louis
- Notable works: Religion Explained
- Website: pascalboyer.net

Pascal Robert Boyer is a Franco-American cognitive anthropologist and evolutionary psychologist, mostly known for his work in the cognitive science of religion.

== Life and career ==
Boyer studied at Paris Nanterre University and the University of Cambridge, where he worked with Jack Goody on memory constraints on the transmission of oral literature. He then taught at Cambridge for eight years, before taking up the position of Henry Luce Professor of Individual and Collective Memory at Washington University in St. Louis, where he teaches classes on evolutionary psychology and anthropology.

Boyer was a Guggenheim Fellow and a visiting professor at the University of California, Santa Barbara and the University of Lyon, France. He is a Member of the American Academy of Arts and Sciences.

== Work ==
Pascal Boyer studies how human biases and cognitive faculties have resulted in or encouraged cultural phenomena. He advocates the idea that human evolution resulted in specialized capacities that guide our social relations, culture, and predilections toward religious beliefs. Boyer and others propose that these cognitive mechanisms make the acquisition of “religious” themes, like concepts of spirits, ghosts, ancestors or gods, highly transmissible within a community.

Boyer has conducted long-term ethnographic fieldwork in Cameroon, where he studied the transmission of Fang oral epics and its traditional religion. Most of his later work consists of an experimental study of cognitive capacities underlying cultural transmission. He also conducted studies on supernatural concepts and their retention in memory and a general description of cognitive processes involved in the transmission of religious concepts. More recently, he has written on the concept of Folk economics, which proposes that evolved cognitive biases play an important role in how laypeople view the economy.

== Religion Explained ==
Of Boyer's books, Religion Explained: The Evolutionary Origins of Religious Thought is the best known. Boyer used cognitive anthropology to provide a new understanding of religion. Religion for Boyer consists of cultural representations, that is, ideas that appear in roughly similar forms in the minds of different individuals in a group. To explain how religion emerges and is transmitted, we must explain how these ideas are acquired, stored and transmitted better than other possible ideas. Findings from cognitive and developmental psychology suggest that some combinations of ideas are particularly easy to acquire and remember. Among these, we find many standard themes of supernatural and religious imagination, such as the notion of an agent with counter-intuitive physics and standard psychology, e.g. ghosts and gods that are not material but have the same mental capacities as humans. According to Boyer, there are only a few such combinations of intuitive and counter-intuitive material that are optimal for acquisition and memory - and these happen to be the most frequent ones in the world's religions.

In this cognitive paradigm belief in supernatural agents is natural and part of human cognition. However, religion is not "special". That is, there are no specific mental systems that create religious ideas. Rather, these ideas are an expected by-product of mental systems that evolved for other reasons, not for religion. For instance, we easily entertain the notion of a "god" or "ghost" because of our intuitive psychology, what psychologists sometimes call "Theory of Mind".

Justin L. Barrett has argued that Boyer’s previous book The Naturalness of Religious Ideas: A Cognitive Theory of Religion is an attempt to reform traditional models and allow understanding religion in terms of cognitive science. Boyer dismantles many traditional assumptions of cultural studies. However, Barrett claims, the book lacks clarity and organization.

== Minds Make Societies ==
In this book, Boyer explains the relevance of evolutionary psychology to understanding human societies, from the small-scale communities in which humans evolved to modern mass-societies. The blurb states that the book "integrates insights from evolutionary biology, genetics, psychology, economics, and more to explore the development and workings of human societies".

In Boyer's view, this new integrated social science can provide new answers, based on scientific evidence, to important questions about society. Each of the six chapters in the book focuses on one of these questions: (1) Why do humans favor their own group?, (2) Why do people communicate so much wrong information (rumors, superstition, etc.)?, (3) Why are there religions?, (4) What is the natural family?, (5) How can societies be just? and (6) Can human minds understand human societies?

One running theme in the book is that social sciences can progress if they abandon "chimerical" notions like "nature" and "culture", that do not correspond to anything in the world, and rather consider how the particular history of natural selection in the human line resulted in specific preferences and capacities. Social scientists should also abandon classical assumptions that name problems instead of solving them, like the idea that power is similar to a force, or that social norms exist outside the heads of human beings.

Boyer recommends the kind of "consilient" social science outlined by E. O. Wilson, and he argues that we already have the elements of such a social science, as illustrated in his book.

== Books ==
- Tradition as Truth and Communication. Cambridge: Cambridge University Press. 1992. ISBN 978-0-521-37417-0.
- Cognitive Aspects Of Religious Symbolism. Edited by Pascal Boyer. Cambridge: Cambridge University Press. 1992.
- The Naturalness of Religious Ideas: A Cognitive Theory of Religion. Berkeley: University of California Press. 1994. ISBN 978-0-520-07559-7.
- Religion Explained: The Evolutionary Origins of Religious Thought (2001) Basic Books. ISBN 0-465-00696-5.
  - Translated into Greek as Και ο Άνθρωπος Έπλασε τους Θεούς, by Dimitris Xygalatas and Nikolas Roubekas (ISBN 9789602882252).
  - Translated into Polish as “I człowiek stworzył bogów… Jak powstała religia?” (ISBN 8373379851).
  - Translated into Russian as "Объясняя религию. Природа религиозного мышления" (ISBN 9785916716320)
- Memory in Mind and Culture. Edited by Pascal Boyer and James V. Wertsch. New York: Cambridge University Press. 2009.
- The Fracture of an Illusion: Science and the Dissolution of Religion. Vandenhoeck & Ruprecht August 23, 2010.
- Minds Make Societies, New Haven: Yale University Press, 2018 (ISBN 9780300223453).

== See also ==
- Evolutionary origin of religions
- Evolutionary epistemology
- Evolutionary psychology
- Faith and rationality
- Memetics
- Relationship between religion and science
- Cognitive science of religion
- Evolutionary psychology of religion
- Cognitive anthropology
- Folk economics
