= Origin of religion (disambiguation) =

Origin of religion may refer to:

- Evolutionary origins of religion for information on the evolutionary evidence for the when, where and how the first religions may have arisen.
- Evolutionary psychology of religion for the psychological factors that could have led to religion during evolution.
- History of religion for the portions of religions' origins that have been recorded.
