= List of religious studies scholars =

Religious studies is the academic field of multi-disciplinary, secular study of religious beliefs, behaviors, and institutions.

The list is in alphabetical order by the scholar's last name.

== A-D ==
- Edwin David Aponte
- Raymond Apple, Australian Rabbi, writer on Jewish, interfaith and freemasonic issues
- Karen Armstrong, author of A History of God
- Miguel Asín Palacios, Spanish Arabist, work on the mutual influence between Christianity and Islam
- Robert Baker Aitken, author of numerous academic books on Zen Buddhism
- Reza Aslan, author of Zealot: The Life and Times of Jesus of Nazareth, professor of creative writing at the University of California, Riverside
- Edmond La Beaume Cherbonnier, professor and scholar, author of Hardness of Heart (1955)
- Catherine Bell, ritual studies scholar
- Herbert Berg, scholar of Islamic origins
- Peter Berger, author of The Sacred Canopy
- Pascal Boyer, author of Religion Explained: The Evolutionary Origins of Religious Thought
- Joseph Epes Brown, author of The Sacred Pipe and Teaching Spirits: Understanding Native American Religious Traditions
- Rudolf Bultmann
- Frank G. Carver
- John Corrigan, co-author of Religion in America, editor of the "Chicago History of American Religion" book series (University of Chicago Press)
- Frank Moore Cross, emeritus professor Harvard Divinity School, interpreter of the Dead Sea Scrolls
- Ioan Petru Culianu, author of The HarperCollins Concise Guide to World Religions and Out of This World
- Miguel A. De La Torre
- Arti Dhand, associate professor at the University of Toronto, Department for the Study of Religion
- Wendy Doniger, (formerly published as Wendy O'Flaherty) is a leading researcher in Hinduism among other topics on religion.
- Émile Durkheim, author of The Elementary Forms of the Religious Life, a seminal work on sociology of religion

== E-H ==
- Diana L. Eck
- Bart D. Ehrman, author, and James A. Gray Distinguished Professor of Religious Studies at the University of North Carolina at Chapel Hill
- Mircea Eliade, author of The Sacred and the Profane and History of Religious Ideas, vol.I-III
- Steven Engler, Canadian scholar of religion
- Erasmus
- Carl W. Ernst, specialist in Islamic studies, author of Sufism: An Introduction to the Mystical Tradition of Islam
- E. E. Evans-Pritchard
- James George Frazer, author of The Golden Bough
- Sigmund Freud, author of Totem and Taboo, The Future of an Illusion, and Moses and Monotheism
- Rajmohan Gandhi, author of Revenge and Reconciliation
- Arnold van Gennep
- Anthony Giddens
- René Girard, whose theological works include Things Hidden Since the Foundation of the World
- Stephen D. Glazier, editor of The Encyclopedia of African and African American Religions
- Richard Gombrich
- Justo L. González, author of The Story of Christianity and a leading figure in Hispanic theology
- John R. Hall, American sociologist of religion
- Wouter Hanegraaff, author of New Age Religion and Western Culture: Esotericism in the Mirror of Secular Thought
- Ishwar C. Harris
- Nathan O. Hatch, author of "The Democratization of American Christianity"
- Friedrich Heiler
- Steven Heine, scholar of East Asian Buddhism
- Susan Henking, scholar of religion, gender and sexuality
- Peter L Hobson, author of The Hermeneutics of Followship: Relocating Narratives of Discipleship
- Zora Neale Hurston, author of Mules and Men and Hoodoo in America

== I-M ==
- Ada Maria Isasi-Diaz
- William James, author of The Varieties of Religious Experience
- Grace Jantzen
- Carl Jung
- Klaus Klostermaier
- Adam Kotsko, author of Zizek and Theology and The Politics of Redemption, and translator of Agamben
- Hans Küng, Catholic theologian, author of Tracing the Way. Spiritual Dimensions of the World Religions
- Gerard van der Leeuw
- Peggy Levitt
- Bruce Lincoln (University of Chicago), author of Holy Terrors: Thinking about Religion after September 11, Theorizing Myth: Narrative, Ideology, and Scholarship and Discourse and the Construction in Society
- Philip Lindholm
- Bronisław Malinowski
- Martin E. Marty (University of Chicago), author of the series Modern American Religion, editor of The Fundamentalism Project
- John Macquarrie
- Jean-François Mayer, Swiss religious historian
- Russell T. McCutcheon
- Josef W. Meri
- George Foot Moore, scholar and theologian, author of History of Religions (two volumes – 1914, 1919) and Judaism (two volumes, 1927)
- Max Müller, editor of Sacred Books of the East

== N-S ==
- Seyyed Hossein Nasr, author of Islam: Religion, History, and Civilization
- Rudolf Otto, author of The Idea of the Holy
- Elaine Pagels, author of The Gnostic Gospels
- Christopher Partridge, author of The Re-enchantment of the West
- Geoffrey Parrinder, former professor at King's College London and author of What World Religions Teach Us (1968)
- Francis Edward Peters, Professor at New York University and author of numerous books on Christianity, Judaism and Islam
- Stephen Prothero, Professor at Boston University and author of "American Jesus"; "Religious Literacy"; and "God Is Not One."
- Roy Rappaport
- Olivier Roy
- Arne Runeberg (1912–1979), Finnish sociologist, anthropologist and linguist
- Annemarie Schimmel, author of Mystical Dimensions of Islam
- Wilhelm Schmidt
- Arvind Sharma, author of Women in World Religions
- Christian Smith, author of Soul Searching: the Religious and Spiritual Lives of American Teenagers
- Huston Smith, author of The World's Religions
- Jonathan Z. Smith (University of Chicago), author of Map is Not Territory; Imagining Religion: From Babylon to Jonestown and To Take Place: Toward Theory in Ritual
- Wilfred Cantwell Smith
- William Robertson Smith, Scottish theologian, early work in the "higher criticism" of the Bible
- Ninian Smart, author of Dimensions of the Sacred
- Nathan Söderblom
- Rodney Stark
- Michael Stausberg
- John Shelby Spong, author The Sins of Scripture: Exposing the Bible's Texts of Hate to Reveal the God of Love and other works

== T-Z ==
- Einar Thomassen
- Toulmin, Joshua (1740–1815), English radical Dissenting minister
- Edward Burnett Tylor
- Joachim Wach
- James Webb, author of The Occult Underground and The Harmonious Circle
- Max Weber
- Christian K. Wedemeyer
- Wesley Wildman
- Linda Woodhead, MBE. Director of The Religion and Society Programme
- Zakir Naik
- Benjamin E. Zeller, American historian of religion and author
- Heinrich Zimmer, Indologist, author of Philosophies of India and Myths and Symbols in Indian Art and Civilization
- Volker Zotz
- Ghil'ad Zuckermann, linguist, revivalist, scholar of language, religion and nationhood
