= HADD =

HADD may refer to:

- Dembidolo Airport ICAO code
- Hadd, an Islamic concept
- Hyperactive agency detection device
- Hydroxyapatite deposition disease
