= Edmond La Beaume Cherbonnier =

The Reverend Edmond La B. Cherbonnier
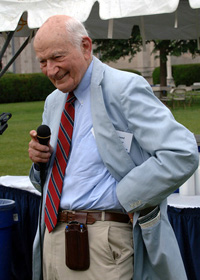
- American scholar of religious studies and professor
- Born: February 11, 1918; Saint Louis, Missouri
- Died: March 7, 2017 (aged 99)
- Education: Harvard University; Union Theological Seminary; Cambridge University; Columbia University

Edmond La Beaume Cherbonnier (February 11, 1918 – March 7, 2017) was an American scholar in the field of religious studies. He served as Professor of Religion at Trinity College, Connecticut, and as a deacon in the Episcopal Church. He is known for his work on Christianity, analyzing idolatry and distinctions between mystical and biblical thought, his efforts on developing and advancing religious studies, and for founding the Religion Department at Trinity College in 1955.

== Early life ==
Edmond Cherbonnier was born on February 11, 1918, in Saint Louis, Missouri. His father, Edward Goodwin Cherbonnier, was a vice president of Ralston Purina.

After graduation from St. Louis Country Day School, Cherbonnier entered Harvard University, where he majored in geology. In 1939, he received the degree of Bachelor of Arts cum laude. During his undergraduate years, when associated with Harvard’s Winthrop House, (one of twelve undergraduate residences) he was elected President of the Phillips Brooks House Association (a student-run public service organization). He was a member of the Winthrop House Committee and the Harvard Glee Club, and an active participant for several years in social service work at the Phillips Brooks House Association.

== Professional career ==
Cherbonnier held a brief post as teacher of Latin at Avon Old Farms School in Avon, Connecticut. Shortly thereafter, Cherbonnier enrolled at Union Theological Seminary in New York; his graduate studies were interrupted while he served as a naval aviator during World War II. After his wartime service, he resumed his theological studies and in 1947 received the degree of Bachelor of Divinity from Union. In the same year he was ordained a deacon by the Episcopal Bishop of Missouri. Subsequent study on a Fiske Fellowship from Harvard led to the degrees of Bachelor of Arts (1948) and Master of Arts (1952) from Cambridge University, England. Additionally, from 1948-1949 Cherbonnier was in residence as a Union Seminary Traveling Fellow at the University of Strasbourg and the University of Zurich.

Cherbonnier entered the doctoral program at Columbia University; while studying during the 1949-1950 school year, Cherbonnier was a tutor-assistant to Henry P. Van Dusen at Union. He held a one-year appointment as assistant professor of religion at Vassar (1950–1951) which resulted in a Ph.D. degree in religion conferred by Columbia. His doctoral thesis was entitled "Freedom and Time: A Study in Some Recent Contributions to the Problem".

From Vassar, Cherbonnier joined the faculty of Barnard College of Columbia University, where he remained until the spring of 1955 as assistant and associate professor of religion. In addition, from 1952 to 1955 he served as Deacon at the nearby Cathedral Church of Saint John the Divine, during the Deanship of the later controversial Bishop of California James A. Pike. On May 31, 1954, The New York Times highlighted one of his cathedral sermons in an article "Worship Of Ideals Held Destructive".

Cherbonnier received praise for his efforts early in his career. In 1952, Reinhold Niebuhr expressed gratitude to Cherbonnier in his Preface to The Irony Of American History "for careful reading of my manuscript and for many suggestions for its improvement".

In 1955, Cherbonnier’s book Hardness of Heart was published by Doubleday. A volume in the “Christian Faith Series” edited by Reinhold Niebuhr, the study provided a contemporary interpretation of the doctrine of sin. During the next year it was also published by London’s Victor Gollancz Ltd. Psychiatrist Karl Menninger, M.D. presented a synopsis of the book in his The Vital Balance: “Cherbonnier in his beautiful essay, Hardness of Heart, describes the forms of idolatry indulged in by the hardhearted. He lists the hidden gods of cynicism as nationalism, humanism, phallicism, promiscuity, the glorification of money, and the various euphemisms such as frugality, shrewdness, and sound economy. Cherbonnier also lists iconoclasm, existentialist despair, and a so-called state of “adjustment” and “relatedness” toward which some psychiatrists are believed to steer their patients.”

In the fall of 1955, Cherbonnier was invited by Trinity College in Hartford, Connecticut, to establish a religion department. After serving two years as an associate professor, he was promoted to full professor and was then joined by a second department member, Dr. Theodor Marcus Mauch. Under Cherbonnier’s chairmanship, the department was enlarged to a staff of five full-time professors plus adjunct faculty.

Professor Cherbonnier was awarded the degree of Doctor of Divinity, honoris causa by the University of Vermont in 1959. He took a sabbatical leave in 1962-63 to London, England, which was partially underwritten by a Lilly Post-Doctoral Fellowship. He spent his sabbatical performing further work on distinctions between mystical and biblical thought. Dr. Cherbonnier took another leave for the 1970-1972 academic years plus the first semester of 1972-1973, which he also spent in England. He retired from his Trinity position in 1983.

Dr. Cherbonnier's interests include the Shroud of Turin and the life of Saint Joan of Arc (1412-1431 C.E.).

He is a chaplain in the Most Venerable Order of the Hospital of St. John of Jerusalem - Priory in the United States.

== Works ==
Many of Dr. Cherbonnier’s published writings, including Hardness of Heart, are accessible online. His papers were published in distinguished scholarly journals, such as the Harvard Theological Review, Commentary, Theology Today, Conservative Judaism, and the Journal of Religion. Additionally, he contributed essays to dictionaries and chapters to a number of books. His works include:

- Freedom and Time: A Study in Some Recent Contributions to the Problem, Dissertation Abstracts International, Volume 12-01, 1951, p. 76
- "Biblical Metaphysics and Christian Philosophy", Theology Today, October 1952
- "The Theology of the Word of God", The Journal of Religion, 33(16), January 1953, pp. 16–30
- "Jerusalem and Athens", Anglican Theological Review, 36, October 1954, pp. 252–271
- Hardness of Heart, Doubleday, 1955
- "Mystical vs. Biblical Symbolism," The Christian Scholar, 39(1), March 1956, pp. 32–44
- "Biblical Faith and the Idea of Tragedy," The Tragic Vision and the Christian Faith, ed. Nathan A. Scott, 1957
- "Is There a Biblical Metaphysic?", Theology Today, 15(4), January 1959, pp. 454–69
- "A.J. Heschel and the Philosophy of the Bible", Commentary Magazine, January 1959, pp. 23–29
- "The logic of Biblical Anthromorphism" Harvard Theological Review 54(3), July 1962, p. 187
- The Diaconate Now, ed. Richard T. Nolan, Corpus Books, 1968
- "Heschel as a Religious Thinker", Conservative Judaism, 23(1), Fall 1968, pp. 25–39
- "Heschel's Time Bomb", Conservative Judaism, 28(1), Fall 1973, pp. 10–18
- "In Defense of Anthropomorphism," in Truman G. Madsen (editor), Reflections on Mormonism: Judaeo-Christian Parallels: Papers Delivered at the Religious Studies Center Symposium, Brigham Young University, March 10–11, 1978 (Provo, Utah: Religious Studies Center, Brigham Young University and Bookcraft, 1978), 162, pp. 49–50."
