= Cognitive science of religion =

Study of religious thought and behavior

Cognitive science of religion is the study of religious thought, theory, and behavior from the perspective of the cognitive sciences. Scholars in this field seek to explain how human minds acquire, generate, and transmit religious thoughts, practices, and schemas by means of ordinary cognitive capacities.

== History ==
Although religion has been the subject of serious scientific study since at least the late nineteenth century, the study of religion as a cognitive phenomenon is relatively recent. While it often relies upon earlier research within anthropology of religion and sociology of religion, cognitive science of religion considers the results of that work within the context of evolutionary and cognitive theories. As such, cognitive science of religion was only made possible by the cognitive revolution of the 1950s and the development, starting in the 1970s, of sociobiology and other approaches explaining human behaviour in evolutionary terms, especially evolutionary psychology.

While Dan Sperber foreshadowed cognitive science of religion in his 1975 book Rethinking Symbolism, the earliest research to fall within the scope of the discipline was published during the 1980s. Stewart E. Guthrie's "A cognitive theory of religion" was significant for examining anthropomorphism in religion. This work ultimately led to the development of the concept of the hyperactive agency detection device, which is a key concept within cognitive science of religion. The work of Scott Atran on Cognitive Foundations of Natural History: Towards an Anthropology of Science contrasted the cognitive processing of attention-arresting, and therefore memorable and culturally transmissible, aspects of counter-intuitive "mythico-religious beliefs" (e.g., bodiless beings) with counter-intuitive aspects of scientific thinking that also initially violate common-sense ontological assumptions about the structure of the world (e.g., invisible creatures).

The field was formally established in the 1990s. During that decade, a large number of highly influential and foundational books and articles were published. These included Rethinking Religion: Connecting Cognition and Culture and Bringing Ritual to Mind: Psychological Foundations of Cultural Forms by E. Thomas Lawson and Robert McCauley, Naturalness of Religious Ideas by Pascal Boyer, Inside the Cult and Arguments and Icons by Harvey Whitehouse, and Guthrie's book-length development of his earlier theories in Faces in the Clouds. In the 1990s, these and other researchers, who had been working independently in a variety of different disciplines, discovered each other's work and found valuable parallels between their approaches, with the result that something of a self-aware research tradition began to coalesce. By 2000, the field was well-enough defined for Justin L. Barrett to coin the term 'cognitive science of religion' in his article "Exploring the natural foundations of religion".

The field remains somewhat loosely defined, bringing together researchers from various subfields. Much of the cohesion in the field comes not from shared detailed theoretical commitments but from a shared methodological perspective: the willingness to view religion in cognitive and evolutionary terms.

== Theoretical basis ==
Despite a lack of agreement concerning the theoretical basis for work in cognitive science of religion, it is possible to outline some tendencies. Most significant of these is reliance upon the theories developed within evolutionary psychology. That particular approach to evolutionary explanations of human behaviour is particularly suitable to the cognitive byproduct explanation of religion that is most popular among cognitive scientists of religion. This is because of the focus on byproduct and ancestral trait explanations within evolutionary psychology. A particularly significant concept associated with this approach is modularity of mind, used as it is to underpin accounts of the mental mechanisms seen to be responsible for religious beliefs. Important examples of work that falls under this rubric are provided by research carried out by Pascal Boyer, Scott Atran, and Justin L. Barrett.

These theoretical commitments are not shared by all cognitive scientists of religion, however. Ongoing debates regarding the comparative advantages of different evolutionary explanations for human behaviour find a reflection within cognitive science of religion with dual inheritance theory recently gaining adherents among researchers in the field, including Armin Geertz and Ara Norenzayan. The perceived advantage of this theoretical framework is its ability to deal with more complex interactions between cognitive and cultural phenomena, but it comes at the cost of experimental design having to take into consideration a richer range of possibilities.

== Main concepts ==
=== Cognitive byproduct ===
The view that religious beliefs and practices should be understood as nonfunctional but as produced by human cognitive mechanisms that are functional outside of the context of religion. Examples of this are the hyperactive agent detection device and the minimally counterintuitive concepts or the process of initiation explaining Buddhism and Taoism. The cognitive byproduct explanation of religion is an application of the concept of spandrel and of the concept of exaptation explored by Stephen Jay Gould among others. The view that religious beliefs and practices are evolutionary spandrels has a number of critics.

=== Minimally counterintuitive concepts ===
Concepts that mostly fit human preconceptions but break with them in one or two striking ways. These concepts are both easy to remember (thanks to the counterintuitive elements) and easy to use (thanks to largely agreeing with what people expect). Examples include talking trees and noncorporeal agents. Pascal Boyer argues that many religious entities fit into this category. Boyer argued that minimally counterintuitive concepts (MCI) i.e., concepts that violate a few ontological expectations of a category such as the category of an agent, are more memorable than intuitive and maximally counterintuitive (MXCI) concepts. A number of experimental psychology studies have found support for Boyer's hypothesis. Upal labelled this as the minimal counterintuitiveness effect or the MCI-effect.

Boyer originally did not precisely specify the number of expectation-violations that would render an idea maximally counterintuitive. Early empirical studies including those by Boyer himself and others did not study MXCI concepts. Both these studies only used concepts violating a single expectation (which were labelled as MCI concepts). Atran was the first to study memory for MXCI concepts and labeled concepts violating 2-expectations as maximally counterintuitive. Studies by the I-75 Cognition and Culture Group also labelled ideas violating two expectations as maximally counterintuitive. Barrett argued that ideas violating 1 or 2 ontological expectations should be considered MCI and only ideas violating 3 or more expectations should be labelled MXCI. Subsequent studies of the MCI effect have followed this revised labelling scheme.

Upal has divided the cognitive accounts that explain the MCI effect into two categories: the context-based model and content-based view of minimal counterintuitiveness. The context-based view emphasizes the role played by context in making an idea counterintuitive whereas the content-based view ignores the role of context.

==== Context-based model of minimal counterintuitiveness ====
The context-based model of the counterintuitiveness effect is a cognitive model of the MCI-effect. The context-based model emphasizes the role played by the context in which a concept appears in making it counterintuitive. This is in contrast to the traditional (also called content-based) accounts of the MCI-effect which underscore the role played by context. Barrett & Nyhoff (2001) claim that this is necessary in order to explain cross-cultural success of religious concepts.

Although research on schemas and scripts suggests the possibility that incongruent concepts may be better remembered thus contributing to their transmission, these conceptual structures are culturally variable to a large extent and will not provide an explanation for cross-culturally prevalent classes of concepts.

The context-based model was first proposed by cognitive scientist Afzal Upal in 2005 and has been subsequently elaborated in a number of publications. According to the context-based model, counterintuitiveness of a concept depends on the mental knowledge activated in the mind of a reader at the time at which the reader processes the concept in question. Since this mental knowledge clearly varies from person to person, a concept that is counterintuitive to one person may not be so for another person. Furthermore, a concept may be counterintuitive to a person at one time but not at another time.

In fact the context-based model predicts that since people learn, their conceptual representations change over time. When people encounter a minimally counterintuitive concept for the first time, they are forced to make sense out of it (Upal (2005) labelled it as the postdiction process). The postdiction process results in the formation of new knowledge structures and in strengthening of existing knowledge structures. Because of these new knowledge structures, when the same concept is encountered again, it does not seem as counterintuitive as it did in the past. The context-based model predicts that over time the counterintuitive concepts come to lose their very counterintuitiveness (and the memory advantages it confers upon the concept).

=== Hyperactive agency detection device ===
Cognitive scientist Justin L. Barrett postulates that this mental mechanism, whose function is to identify the activity of agents, may contribute to belief in the presence of the supernatural. Given the relative costs of failing to spot an agent, the mechanism is said to be hyperactive, producing a large number of false positive errors. Stewart E. Guthrie and others have claimed these errors can explain the appearance of supernatural concepts.

=== Pro-social adaptation ===
According to the prosocial adaptation account of religion, religious beliefs and practices should be understood as having the function of eliciting adaptive prosocial behaviour and avoiding the free rider problem. Within the cognitive science of religion this approach is primarily pursued by Richard Sosis. David Sloan Wilson is another major proponent of this approach and interprets religion as a group-level adaptation, but his work is generally seen as falling outside the cognitive science of religion.

=== Costly signaling ===
Practices that, due to their inherent cost, can be relied upon to provide an honest signal regarding the intentions of the agent. Richard Sosis has suggested that religious practices can be explained as costly signals of the willingness to cooperate. A similar line of argument has been pursued by Lyle Steadman and Craig Palmer. Alternatively, D. Jason Slone has argued that religiosity may be a costly signal used as a mating strategy insofar as religiosity serves as a proxy for "family values".

=== Dual inheritance ===
In the context of cognitive science of religion, dual inheritance theory can be understood as attempting to combine the cognitive byproduct and prosocial adaptation accounts using the theoretical approach developed by Robert Boyd and Peter Richerson, among others. The basic view is that while belief in supernatural entities is a cognitive byproduct, cultural traditions have recruited such beliefs to motivate prosocial behaviour. A sophisticated statement of this approach can be found in Scott Atran and Joseph Henrich (2010).

== See also ==
- Cognitive ecology of religion – Study of links between beliefs and environment
- Evolutionary epistemology – Ambiguous term applied to several concepts
- Evolutionary origin of religions – Emergence of religious behavior discussed in terms of natural evolution
- Evolutionary psychology of religion – Study of religious belief using evolutionary psychology principles
- International Association for the Cognitive Science of Religion (IACSR) – Cognitive science organization
- Neurotheology – Attempts to explain religious experience in neuroscientific terms
- Psychology of religion – Analytic approach to religion
- Relationship between religion and science
