= Madhav Sadashiv Gore =

Indian social scientist (1921–2010)

- Born: 15 August 1921; Hubli, Karnataka, India
- Died: 19 November 2010 (aged 89); Hubli, Karnataka, India
- Occupations: Social scientist Writer; Academic
- Spouse: Phyllis Madhav
- Children: A son and a daughter
- Parent(s): Sadashiv Ramchandra; Venutai
- Awards: Padma Bhushan; ICSW Award; ISS Life Time Achievement Award

Madhav Sadashiv Gore (1921–2010) was an Indian social scientist, writer, academic and the chancellor of Jawaharlal Nehru University, Delhi. He was the Director of Tata Institute of Social Sciences (TISS), the vice-chancellor of the University of Mumbai and a recipient of the Life Time Achievement Award of Indian Sociological Society.

The Government of India awarded him the third highest civilian honour of the Padma Bhushan, in 1975, for his contributions to social sciences.

== Biography ==
Gore was born on 15 August 1921 at Hubli in the south Indian state of Karnataka to Sadashiv Ramchandra and Venutai and completed his graduation with honors from the University of Mumbai in 1942. Joining Tata Institute of Social Sciences, he secured the post-graduate Diploma in Social Service Administration (DSSA) in 1945 during which time he was selected for the Sir Dorabji Tata Research Fellowship. Immediately after obtaining a master's degree in sociology from the University of Mumbai in 1948, he started his career as a lecturer at the Delhi School of Social Work where he became principal in 1953, serving in that post until 1962. During this period he led an extensive sociological study of vagrancy and begging in Delhi, carried out in 1955 and published in 1959, which drew on welfare policy in England and America. He also continued his doctoral research and secured a doctoral degree (PhD) from Columbia University in 1961. He would later publish his thesis, The Impact of Industrialization and Urbanization on the Aggarwal Family in Delhi Area as a book in 1990, truncating the name as Urbanization and Family Change. In between, he served as a visiting professor at Beloit College of the University of Wisconsin during 1960–61.

In 1962, Gore moved back to Mumbai and took up the post of the director of Tata Institute of Social Sciences and continued there till his superannuation in 1982. Afterwards, he returned to research on the backward class leadership in the state on a Homi Bhabha Fellowship but, a year later, he was appointed as the vice-chancellor of University of Mumbai, a post he held till 1986 when he resigned in protest from the position, allegedly due to a scandal involving award of extra marks to the daughter of Shivajirao Patil Nilangekar, the then chief minister of Maharashtra. In 1997, he became the Chancellor of Jawaharlal Nehru University and stayed at the post till 2002.

Gore published several articles and books including Social work and Social Work Education, Urbanization and Family Change, Social Aspects Of Development, Education and Modernization in India and Vitthal Ramji Shinde: An Assessment of His Contributions. He was the president of organizations such as the Indian Society of Criminology from 1977 to 1979, Indian Sociological Society from 1981 to 1982 and the Association of Indian Universities from 1984 to 1985. He was the president of the Indian chapter of the International Association of Schools of Social Work from 1962 to 1966, during which time he served as the vice-president of the parent association. The Government of India awarded him the civilian honor of the Padma Bhushan in 1975 and he received the Lifetime Achievement Award of the Indian Sociological Society in 2006. He was also a recipient of the Special Award of the Indian Council of Social Welfare.

Gore was married to Phyllis and the couple had two children, Vikas and Anita. He died on 19 November 2010 at his home town of Hubli, at the age of 89.

== Selected bibliography ==
- Gore, M.S.; J. S. Mathur; M. R. Laljani, M. R. and H. S. Takulia (1959) The beggar problem in metropolitan Delhi, Delhi School of Social Work
- Madhav Sadashiv Gore (1966). Social work and Social Work Education. Asia Publishing House. p. 155. ASIN B0000CN9MD.
- M. S. Gore; I. P. Desai; Suma Chitnis (1970). Field Studies in the Sociology of Education: All India Report. National Council of Educational Research and Training.
- M. S. Gore (1973). Some Aspects of Social Development. Department of Social Work, University of Hong Kong and Tata Institute of Social Sciences, Bombay.
- M. S. Gore (1977). Indian Youth: Processes of Socialization. Vishwa Yuvak Kendra.
- M. S. Gore (1982). Education and modernization in India. Rawat Publications.
- M. S. Gore (1985). Social Aspects Of Development. Rawat Publications. ISBN 978-81-7033-010-3.
- M. S. Gore (1986). Jotirao Phule and Vithalrao Shinde. Lala Lajpatrai College of Commerce & Economics.
- M. S. Gore (1988). Education for Women's Equality. Centre for Women's Development Studies.
- M. S. Gore (1989). Non-Brahman movement in Maharashtra. Segment Book Distributors.
- M. S. Gore (1990). Vitthal Ramji Shinde: An Assessment of His Contributions. Tata Institute of Social Sciences.
- M. S. Gore (1990). Urbanization and Family Change. Popular Prakashan. pp. 13–. ISBN 978-0-86132-262-6.
- M. S. Gore (1993). The Social Context of an Ideology: Ambedkar's Political and Social Thought. Sage Publications. ISBN 978-81-7036-364-4.
- M. S. Gore (2000). Third Survey of Research in Sociology and Social Anthropology. Indian Council of Social Science Research, and Manak Publications.
- M. S. Gore (1 January 2002). Unity in Diversity: The Indian Experience in Nation-Building. Rawat Publications. ISBN 978-81-7033-729-4.
- M. S. Gore (1 January 2003). Social Development: Challenges Faced in an Unequal and Plural Society. Rawat Publications. ISBN 978-81-7033-756-0.
- M. S. Gore (1 November 2011). Social Work and Social Work Education. Rawat Publications. ISBN 978-81-316-0445-8.

== See also ==
- Tata Institute of Social Sciences
- University of Mumbai
- Jawaharlal Nehru University
- Delhi School of Social Work
