= Manoj Kumar Jha =

Indian politician

Manoj Kumar
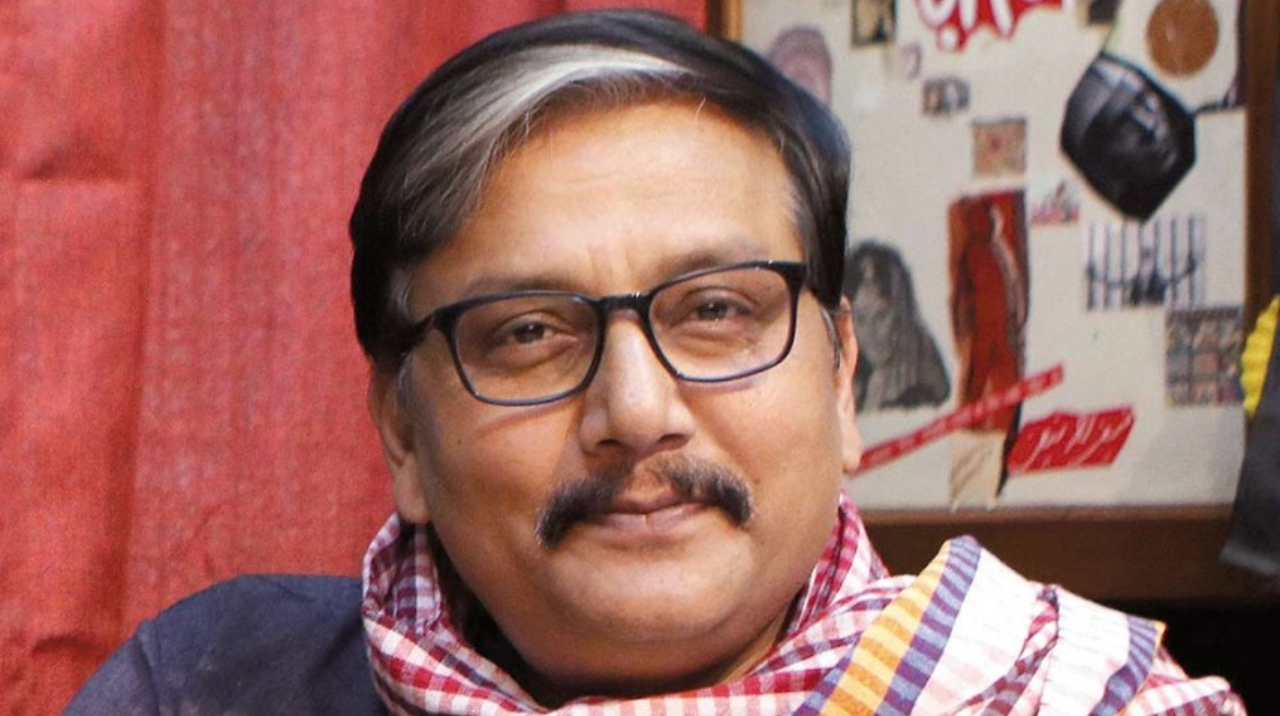

Member of Parliament, Rajya Sabha
- Incumbent
- Assumed office 3 April 2018
- Preceded by: Dharmendra Pradhan
- Constituency: Bihar

Personal details
- Born: 5 August 1967 (age 58) Saharsa, Bihar
- Party: Rashtriya Janata Dal
- Education: M.A. (Social Work), Ph.D.
- Alma mater: Patna College, Delhi University
- Profession: Professor at Delhi School of Social Work, University of Delhi
- As of July, 2021

Manoj Kumar Jha is an Indian politician who is a member of Rajya Sabha in Indian Parliament and a member of Rashtriya Janata Dal. He currently serves as the national spokesperson of the Rashtriya Janata Dal. On 15 March 2018, he was elected unopposed to the Rajya Sabha from the state of Bihar. Jha completed his master's degree from Department of Social Work from Delhi University in 1992 and PhD in 2000. He has been a professor at the Department of Social Work University Of Delhi, and its head between 2014 and 2017. He was the candidate of the United Opposition for the post of Deputy Chairman of the Rajya Sabha and lost to Harivansh Narayan Singh of NDA in 2020.

== Career ==
He was a lecturer at Department of Social Work, Jamia Millia Islamia from 1994 to 2002 before joining Delhi School of Social Work. He is also a visiting faculty to School of Planning and Architecture, Delhi. His research interest also includes political economy and governance, social action and social movements, majority-minority relations, and peace and conflict studies.

In October 2020, it was reported that he had become Tejashwi Yadav's principal political adviser. His popularity amongst citizens increased after his speech during the July 2021 session of the Rajya Sabha (India's upper house of parliament). On 4 February 2022, Jha heavily criticized the President's address to the Rajya Sabha, and called for a "non-partisan" speech representing the concerns of all citizens.

Jha occasionally writes columns for The Hindu and The Indian Express regarding socio-political affairs.
