= Steven Mithen =

British archaeologist

Steven Mithen FBA FSA FSA Scot
- Born: 16 October 1960 (age 66)
- Education: BA, MSc, PhD
- Alma mater: Sheffield University, York University, Cambridge University
- Known for: Evolution of language, music, and the mind, prehistoric hunter-gatherers and the origins of farming
- Scientific career
- Fields: Archeology
- Workplaces: University of Reading

Steven Mithen (born 16 October 1960) is a British archaeologist. He is noted for his work on the evolution of language, music and intelligence, prehistoric hunter-gatherers, and the origins of farming. He is professor of early prehistory at the University of Reading.

== Early life and education ==
Mithen was born on 16 October 1960. In 1983 he graduated with a BA in Prehistory and Archaeology from Sheffield University, followed by a MSc degree in biological computation from York University in 1984 and undertook a PhD in archaeology at Cambridge University, graduating in 1987.

== Academic career ==
Mithen began his academic career as a research fellow in archaeology at Trinity Hall, Cambridge from 1987 to 1990. He was additionally a Cambridge University lecturer in archaeology (1989–1991), and then a research associate at the McDonald Institute for Archaeological Research from 1991 to 1992. In 1992, he joined the University of Reading as a lecturer in archaeology. He was promoted to senior lecturer in 1996, made Reader in Early Prehistory in 1998, and has been Professor of Early Prehistory since 2000.

== Honours ==
In 2004, Mithen was elected a Fellow of the British Academy (FBA), the United Kingdom's national academy for the humanities and social sciences. He was elected a Fellow of the Society of Antiquaries of Scotland (FSA Scot) in 1993 and a Fellow of the Society of Antiquaries of London (FSA) in 1998.

== Publications ==
=== General academic books ===
- Mithen, S. J. (2024) The Language Puzzle: How we Talked Our Way Out of the Stone Age. London: Profile Books. ISBN 978-1-80081-158-4
- Mithen, S. J. (2020) Land of the Ileach: Archaeological Journeys into Islay’s Past. Edinburgh & London: Birlnn Books. ISBN 978-1-912476-82-4
- Mithen, S. J. (2012) Thirst: Water and Power in the Ancient World. London: Weidenfeld & Nicolson. ISBN 978-0-297-86479-0
- Mithen, S. J. (2005) The Singing Neanderthals: The Origins of Music, Language, Mind and Body Cambridge, Massachusetts: Harvard University Press, 2006. Weidenfeld & Nicolson, London. ISBN 978-0-674-02559-2
- Mithen, S. J. (2003) After the Ice: A Global Human History, 20,000-5000 BC. Cambridge, Massachusetts: Harvard University Press, 2004. Weidenfeld & Nicolson, London ISBN 978-0-674-01999-7
- Mithen, S. J. (ed. 1998) Creativity in Human Evolution and Prehistory, London; New York: Routledge, 1998. ISBN 0-415-16096-0
- Mithen, S. J. (1996) The Prehistory of the Mind: A Search for the Origins of Art, Religion, and Science, London: Thames and Hudson, 1996. ISBN 978-0-7538-0204-5
- Mithen, S. J (1990) Thoughtful Foragers: A Study of Prehistoric Decision Making Cambridge [England]; New York: Cambridge University Press, 1990. ISBN 0-521-35570-2

=== Research monographs ===
- Mithen, S. J. & Black, E. (eds) (2011). Water, Life & Civilisation: Climate, Environment and Society in the Jordan Valley. Cambridge University Press/UNESCO International Hydrology Series. ISBN 978-0-521-76957-0
- Mithen, S. J., Finlayson, B., al-Najjar, M., Smith, S., Jenkins, E. & Maričević, D. (2018). WF16, The Excavation of an Early Neolithic Settlement in Southern Jordan. Volume 1 : Architecture, Stratigraphy and Chronology. London: CBRL Research Monograph ISBN 978-0-9539102-3-6
- Mithen, S. J. & Finlayson, B. (Eds. (2006) The Early Prehistory of Wadi Faynan, Southern Jordan: Archaeological Survey of Wadis Faynan, Ghuwayr and Al Bustan and Evaluation of the Pre-Pottery Neolithic A site of WF16. Oxford: Oxbow, 2006-7. ISBN 1-84217-212-3
- Mithen, S. J. (2000) Hunter-gatherer Landscape Archaeology: The Southern Hebrides Mesolithic project, 1988-98 Cambridge: McDonald Institute for Archaeological Research, 2000. 2 volumes. ISBN 1-902937-12-0

=== Faynan Guides ===
- Mithen, S. J., Khoury, F., Greet, B., White, J. & Meslamani, N. (2020). The Birds of Faynan: Past and Present. Reading: University of Reading/Amman: Jordan Birdwatch
- Mithen, S. J., Najjar, M. & Finlayson, B. (2019). The Archaeology of Faynan: A Celebration and Guide. Reading: University of Reading.

=== Selected journal articles ===
- Mithen, S.J., Richardson, A., & Finlayson, B. (2023). The flow of ideas: shared symbolism during Neolithic emergence in Southwest Asia: WF16 and Göbekli Tepe. Antiquity 97, 829-849.
- Maričević, D. & Mithen, S.J. (2023). Excavation and survey at the Giant’s Grave, Slochd Measach, Nereabolls, a Neolithic chambered cairn on the Isle of Islay, Argyll & Bute: chronology, architecture, reuse and demise. Proceedings of the Society of Antiquaries of Scotland 152, 9-52.
- Mithen, S.J. (2022). How long was the Mesolithic-Neolithic overlap in Western Scotland? Evidence from the 4th millennium BC on the Isle of Islay and the evaluation of three scenarios for Mesolithic-Neolithic interaction. Proceedings of the Prehistoric Society 88, 53-77 doi:10.1017/ppr.2023
- Mithen, S.J., White, J., Finlayson, B., Greet, B. & Khoury, F. (2022). Birds as indicators of early Holocene biodiversity and the seasonal nature of human activity at WF16, an early Neolithic site in Faynan, Southern Jordan. Journal of Quaternary Science 37, 1148-1163.
- Mithen, S.J. (2022). Shamanism at the transition from foraging to farming in Southwest Asia: sacra, ritual, and performance at Neolithic WF16 (southern Jordan), Levant, doi:10.1080/00758914.2022.2104559
- Mithen, S.J. & Wicks, K. (2021). Population level models for testing hunter-gatherer resilience and settlement response to the combined impact of abrupt climatic events and sea level change: A case study from the Holocene of northern Britain. Quaternary Science Reviews 265, 107027.
- Jin, G., Chen, S., Li, H., Fan, X., Yang, A. & S.J. Mithen. (2020). The Beixin Culture: Archaeobotanical evidence from Guanqiaocunnan indicates a population dispersal of hunter-gatherer/cultivators into and across the Haida region of northern China. Antiquity, 94, 1426-1443. doi:10.15184/aqy.2020.63
- Mithen, S.J. (2019). Mesolithic fireplaces and the enculturation of Early Holocene landscapes in Britain, with a case study from Western Scotland. Proceedings of the Prehistoric Society 85, pp. 131–159 doi:10.1017/ppr.2019.6
- Mithen, S.J. (2018). Becoming Neolithic in words, thoughts and deeds. Journal of Social Archaeology doi:10.1177/1469605318793958

=== Selected book chapters ===
- Mithen, S.J. (2023). The evolutionary foundations of Neolithic thought: The invention of words, cognitive fluidity and objects as cognitive anchors. In L.E. Bennison-Chapman (ed.) Bookkeeping Without Writing. Early Administrative Technologies in Context. PIHANS CXXXIV. Netherlands Institute for the Near East.
- Mithen, S.J., Wicks, K. & Berg-Hansen, I. (2020). The Mesolithic coastal exploitation of Western Scotland: The impact of climate change and use of favoured place. In A. Schuülke (ed) Coastal Landscapes of the Mesolithic: Human Engagement with the Coast from the Atlantic to the Baltic Sea. London: Routledge
- Wicks, K. & Mithen, S.J. (2017). Economy and environment during the early Mesolithic of western Scotland: Repeated visits to a fishing locality on a small island in the Inner Hebrides. In: P.Persson, E. Reide, B. Skar, H.M.Breivik & L. Johnson (eds) The Ecology of Early Settlement in Northern Europe: Conditions for Subsistence and Survival (Volume 1), pp. 20–55. Sheffield: Equinox Publishing Ltd
- Mithen, S.J., Finlayson, B., Maričević, D., Smith, S., Jenkins, E. and al-Najjar, M. (2015) Death and architecture: The Pre-Pottery Neolithic A burials at WF16, Wadi Faynan, Southern Jordan. In: C. Renfrew, M.J. Boyd & I. Morley (eds) Death Rituals, Social Order and the Archaeology of Immortality in the Ancient World, pp. 82–110. Cambridge: Cambridge University Press
- Mithen, S.J. (2015). Taking a Gamble with alternative approaches to the Mesolithic of western Scotland: locales, rhythms and regions. In: F. Wenban-Smith, F. Coward, R. Hosfield and M. Pope (eds) Settlement, Society and Cognition in Human Evolution, pp. 317–341. Cambridge: Cambridge University Press.

== See also ==
- Behavioral modernity
- Evolutionary psychology of religion
- Evolutionary origin of religions
- Environment and intelligence
