= Paul Rubin =

American economist (1942–2024)

- Born: Paul Harold Rubin; August 9, 1942; Boston, Massachusetts
- Died: August 31, 2024 (aged 82); Sarasota, Florida
- Education: University of Cincinnati, Purdue University
- Scientific career
- Fields: Economics
- Workplaces: Emory University
- Thesis: A theoretical model of the diversification decision of the firm (1970)

Paul Harold Rubin (August 9, 1942 – August 31, 2024) was an American economist and the Samuel Candler Dobbs Professor of Economics Emeritus at Emory University. He was President of the Southern Economic Association in 2012–2013. He was also a research fellow at The Independent Institute.

== Education ==
Rubin received his B.A. with honors from the University of Cincinnati in 1963 and his Ph.D. in economics from Purdue University in 1970, with a thesis entitled "A theoretical model of the diversification decision of the firm".

== Career ==
Rubin served on the faculty of the University of Georgia from 1968 to 1982. For one year (1982–83) he was a professor at Baruch College and the Graduate Center, CUNY. He held senior positions on the President's Council of Economic Advisors in 1981–82 and at the Federal Trade Commission, 1983–85. From 1985 to 1989, he was an adjunct professor at George Washington University Law School. From 1985 to 1987, he was the chief economist at the Consumer Product Safety Commission. From 1987 to 1991 he was vice-president of Glassman-Oliver Economic Consultants in Washington, D.C. He first joined the faculty of Emory in 1991, and became the Samuel Candler Dobbs Professor of economics there in 2003. From 1999 to 2009 he served as a professor of Economics and Law at Emory, and as the Acting Chair of the Economics department there for one year (1993–94).

== Work ==
Rubin's areas of research included: the economics of franchising; determinants of Congressional voting; theoretical models of the evolution of law; Folk economics; the effect of tort reform and capital punishment on death rates; and the costs and benefits of direct-to-consumer pharmaceutical advertising. He has also authored a survey article on the economics of the United States Bill of Rights. In a 2004 study, he argued that the government's encouragement of doctors and patients to use fewer antibiotics and to increase the required number of patients in antibiotic clinical trials, which the government did in an effort to reduce antibiotic resistance, was misguided. He argued that this was the case because these decisions have driven many pharmaceutical companies away from making antibiotics because it is now too expensive to do so. He has also written about evolutionary economics, arguing that different fiscal policies proposed by Democrats and Republicans in part result from different perceptions of human nature by the two parties. He has written about the evolutionary basis for distrust of markets. His most recent book argues that markets are actually cooperative, and that competition is less important than cooperation in economics.

== Books ==
- A Student's Guide to Socialism: How It Will Trash Your Lives, Bombardier Books, 2020
- The Capitalism Paradox: How Cooperation Enables Free Market Competition, Bombardier Books, 2019
- The evolution of efficient common law E. Elgar, 2007
- Darwinian Politics: The Evolutionary Origin of Freedom, Rutgers University Press, 2002 (Choice Outstanding Academic Title, 2004)
- (with Thomas M Lenard; Privacy and the commercial use of personal information Kluwer, 2002
- Managing business transactions : controlling the cost of coordinating, communicating, and decision making Free Press, 1990
- Business firms and the common law : the evolution of efficient rules Prager, 1983
