= Richard Thomas Nolan =

American-Irish clergyman (1937-2020)

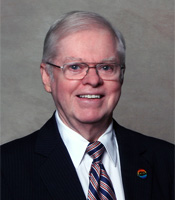
- American scholar of religious studies, professor, and clergyman
- Born: May 30, 1937; Waltham, Massachusetts
- Died: July 4, 2020 (aged 83); Pompano Beach, Florida, U.S.
- Education: Trinity College (CT); The Hartford Seminary; Yale University; New York University
- Partner: Robert C. Pingpank

Richard Thomas Nolan (born May 30, 1937, Waltham, Massachusetts) was a canon of Christ Church Episcopal Cathedral in Hartford, Connecticut and a former college professor of philosophy and religious studies. He is the editor/coauthor of The Diaconate Now (Corpus-World, 1968), and coauthor of Living Issues In Philosophy (Oxford University Press, 1995), Living Issues in Ethics (Wadsworth 1982 and iUniverse 2000), and Soul Mates: More than Partners (online, 2004). Nolan is also the editor of a non-commercial, educational website: philosophy-religion.org. His books have been translated into several languages, including Indonesian and Chinese.

== Education and professional career ==
Richard Nolan is a 1954 alumnus of the Boston Latin School; he then enrolled at The Tabor Academy in Marion, MA. Nolan received his bachelor's degree from Trinity College in 1960. Following his graduation from Trinity, Nolan continued his studies in divinity at Hartford Seminary, receiving his Masters in Divinity in 1963. During his time at Hartford Seminary, he also held his first position as an instructor in Latin and English at Watkinson School in Hartford, CT. Shortly after completing his studies at Hartford, he was ordained a deacon at Christ Church in June 1963 in Waltham, MA. He was ordained a priest in June 1965 at St. John's, in Arlington, MA.

Nolan received his master's in Religion from the Yale University Divinity School in 1967; during his studies, he was also an instructor in math and religion, and associate chaplain at the Cheshire Academy from 1965 to 1967. That same year, Nolan accepted a position as an instructor of philosophy and education at the Hartford Seminary Foundation, and in 1968 was promoted to the position of Assistant Academic Dean.

Nolan continued to expand his responsibilities; in 1969 he accepted a position as an instructor at the Mattatuck Community College in Waterbury, CT. Meanwhile, Nolan was completing his Ph.D. studies at New York University, where he was granted a Doctor of Philosophy in Religion in 1973. Nolan remained an instructor at Mattatuck for many years, becoming an associate professor in 1974, and a full professor of philosophy and social sciences in 1978. He held his post at Mattatuck until 1992. In the intervening years, Dr. Nolan also held adjunct and/or visiting professor positions at Trinity College, Long Island University, the University of Miami, St. Joseph College, Pace University, and many others. Nolan continued teaching at the University of Connecticut, Hartford Graduate Center, and Central Connecticut State University until he retired in 1994. Despite retirement, he continued to teach part-time at Broward Community College, Barry University, Florida Atlantic University, and Palm Beach Community College as recently as 2002.

In 1992, Nolan was named a retired honorary canon for life at Christ Church Cathedral in Hartford, CT. He also holds posts as pastor emeritus for St. Paul's Parish, in Bantam, CT (since 1988), member of the society of regents at Cathedral Church St. John the Divine (since 2002), retired priest-in-residence at St. Andrew's Church in Lake Worth, FL (since 2002), and professor emeritus at Mattatuck Community College, in Waterbury, CT.

Nolan has been the author and editor on numerous books, including The Diaconate Now (Corpus-World, 1968), Living Issues in Philosophy (Oxford University Press, 1995), and Living Issues in Ethics (Wadsworth 1982 and iUniverse 2000). His books have been translated into several languages, including Indonesian and Chinese. His online "Commentary on the Episcopal Prayer Book Catechism" has been translated into Polish. Since 2000, Nolan has been the editor of the website philosophy-religion.org, a reference on philosophy and religion topics and papers, used internationally and recommended by Yale University and several other colleges and universities in the United States and beyond.

== Personal life ==
While attending Trinity College (Connecticut) in 1955, Nolan met his life partner, Robert C. Pingpank. Throughout their lives, they were forced to hide their relationship due to the potential of losing their jobs. During a career change for both in 1967, the couple finally moved in together into a unique two-family house designed by Pingpank, so that they could live together, yet maintain separate addresses and phones. This allowed them to maintain their relationship while avoiding challenges to their careers; they lived in this home until their retirement in 1994, when they moved to Florida. The couple has been profiled by The LGBT Religious Archives Network, and the Center for Lesbian and Gay Studies in Religion and Ministry (a recently established center of the Pacific School of Religion, Berkeley, California).

Richard Nolan and Robert Pingpank were married legally at age 72 on June 4, 2009, in the Trinity College Chapel, Hartford, CT. Nolan and Pingpank resided in the John Knox Village (a continuing care retirement community), Pompano Beach, FL, and were active in Lambda Legal and Integrity Palm Beach.

== Works ==
- The Significance of the Religious Thought of Edmond La B. Cherbonnier for a Basic Objective for Religious Education, Dissertation, New York University, 1973.
- Nolan, Richard T., ed. (1968). The Diaconate Now. Corpus Books. ASIN B001PT7KY4.
- Nolan, Richard T.; Smith, M.; Titus, H. (1994). Living Issues in Philosophy. Oxford University Press. ISBN 0-19-515509-2.
- Kirkpatrick, F.; Morris, K.; Nolan, Richard T. (2000). Living Issues in Ethics. iUniverse. ISBN 0-595-00042-8.
- Nolan, Richard T.; Pingpank, Robert (2004). "Soul Mates: More Than Partners".
