= E. Thomas Lawson =

E. Thomas Lawson

Ernest Thomas (Tom) Lawson (born 27 November 1931, in Cape Town) is an honorary professor at the Institute of Cognition and Culture at Queen's University Belfast. He is the executive editor of the Journal of Cognition and Culture (JCC) and co-founder (with Luther Martin and Donald Wiebe) of the North American Association for the Study of Religion (NAASR). He is a founding member and has served as the first President of the International Association for the Cognitive Science of Religion (IACSR).

Lawson is widely considered to be the founder of the cognitive science of religion field. He has published the books Religions of Africa: Traditions in Transformation (1984) and, with Robert N. McCauley, Rethinking Religion: Connecting Cognition and Culture (1990) and Bringing Ritual to Mind: Psychological Foundations of Ritual Forms (2002). He also played a leading role in the establishment of departments of religion at public universities in the United States during the 1960s. A festschrift in his honor, Religion as a Human Capacity: A Festschrift in Honor of E. Thomas Lawson, was published in 2004. He is emeritus Professor of Comparative Religion at Western Michigan University.

Currently, Lawson is a "Senior Researcher and Distinguished Professor in Residence" at LEVYNA (Laboratory for Experimental Research of Religion) at Masaryk University in Brno, Czech Republic.

In addition to his research activities Lawson is an avid painter, traveler, science fiction reader, and bird watcher.
