= Philip Lieberman =

American linguist (1934–2022)

- Born: 25 October 1934; Brooklyn, New York, U.S.
- Died: 12 July 2022 (aged 87); Providence, Rhode Island, U.S.

Academic background
- Education: Massachusetts Institute of Technology (B.S., M.S., Ph.D.)

Philip Lieberman (October 25, 1934 – July 12, 2022) was a cognitive scientist at Brown University, Providence, Rhode Island, United States. Originally trained in phonetics, he wrote a dissertation on intonation. His career focused on topics in the evolution of language, and particularly the relationship between the evolution of the vocal tract, the human brain, and the evolution of speech, cognition and language.

== Biography ==
Lieberman initially studied electrical engineering at Massachusetts Institute of Technology (MIT). He received his doctorate in linguistics from MIT, completing his dissertation in 1966. In the late 1950s and 1960s he worked as a research assistant before serving in the United States Air Force, carrying out research at the Air Force Cambridge Research Laboratories (AFCRL) and Hanscom Air Force Base as well as working at Haskins Laboratories.

From 1967 to 1974 he worked at the University of Connecticut.

In 1974 he was appointed to the faculty at Brown University, where he was George Hazard Crooker Professor from 1992 to 1997. In 1997 he became the Fred M. Seed Professor of Cognitive and Linguistic Sciences, and in 1999 he became Professor of Anthropology, both at Brown University. Since 2012, when he retired from teaching, he became The George Hazard Crooker University Professor, emeritus

Lieberman was awarded a Guggenheim Fellowship in psychology in 1987. In 1990, Lieberman gave the Nijmegen Lectures of the Max Planck Institute for Psycholinguistics under the title 'The evolution of language and cognition'. He was also a fellow of the American Association for the Advancement of Science, the American Psychological Association, and the American Anthropological Association.

Lieberman's interests included photography and mountaineering. A collection of over 400 photographs of Nepal by Lieberman is held at the Haffenreffer Museum of Anthropology. Lieberman's photographs have also been exhibited at and are in the collections at the Rhode Island School of Design Museum. His photographs of life in remote Himalayan regions can be viewed on the website of the Tibetan and Himalayan Digital Library.

== Partial list of works ==
- Lieberman, Philip (June 1975). On the Origins of Language. New York: Macmillan. ISBN 0-02-370690-2.
- Lieberman, Philip (1984). The Biology and Evolution of Language. Cambridge: Harvard University Press. ISBN 0-674-07413-0.
- Lieberman, Philip (1998). Eve Spoke: Human Language and Human Evolution. Cambridge: W. W. Norton & Company. ISBN 978-0-393-04089-0.
- Lieberman, Philip (2000). Human Language and Our Reptilian Brain. Cambridge: Harvard University Press. ISBN 978-0-674-00793-2.
- Lieberman, Philip (2006). Towards an Evolutionary Biology of Language. Cambridge: Harvard University Press. ISBN 0-674-02184-3.
- Lieberman, Philip (2013). The Unpredictable Species. Princeton University Press.
- Lieberman, Philip (2017). The Theory That Changed Everything: "On the Origin of Species" as a Work in Progress. Cambridge: Columbia University Press. ISBN 978-0-231-17808-2.
