= Folk economics =

Untrained intuitions about economics

Folk economics is the intuitive economics of untrained people. It is derived from the evolutionary basis for human cognition. According to proponents of the field such as Paul Rubin, in the evolutionary environment of our forebears life was mostly static; there was almost no economic growth or innovation. Moreover, there was relatively little specialization (except by age and gender) and the economy was simple. It is proposed that our brains evolved to understand this sort of economy, which may cause a mismatch with more recent market economies based on international trade, complex hierarchies, and industrialization.

One of the most important implications of this model is that humans have evolved to be zero-sum thinkers. That is, when faced with an economic issue our natural tendency is to view it in zero-sum terms, which means one party must lose something for the other to benefit. This leads to fallacies such as the belief that trade is never mutually beneficial, and the dislike of international trade and immigration. It has been suggested that zero-sum thinking is one of the most relevant sources of inefficient economic policies.

The field arose recently from the work of psychologists and economists inspired by evolutionary theory, but speculations on the nature of human economic reasoning go back at least as far as Adam Smith, who suggested that "The instinct to barter and exchange one thing for another is common to all men, and to be found in no other race of animals. No dog exchanges bones with another. This is why human needs are met".

More recently, psychologists such as Steven Pinker suggested that the persecution of middlemen professionals throughout history may be partly explained by the fact that the human mind evolved in an ancestral environment in which the production and trade of goods was not mediated, which leads people to presume that tradesmen and other middleman professionals are exploiters. The economist and Nobel laureate Friedrich Hayek was also interested in the cognitive underpinnings of human economic thinking, and wrote extensively on how people have systematically false beliefs which diverge from accepted economic theories.
