= Evolutionary psychology of religion =

Study of religious belief using evolutionary psychology principles

The evolutionary psychology of religion is the study of religious belief using evolutionary psychology principles. It is one approach to the psychology of religion. As with all other organs and organ functions, the brain's functional structure is argued to have a genetic basis, and is therefore subject to the effects of natural selection and evolution. Evolutionary psychologists seek to understand cognitive processes, religion in this case, by understanding the survival and reproductive functions they might serve.

== Mechanisms of evolution ==
Scientists generally agree with the idea that a propensity to engage in religious behavior evolved early in human history. However, there is disagreement on the exact mechanisms that drove the evolution of the religious mind. There are two schools of thought. One is that religion itself evolved due to natural selection and is an adaptation, in which case religion conferred some sort of evolutionary advantage. The other is that religious beliefs and behaviors, such as the concept of a "proto-god", may have emerged as by-products of other adaptive traits without initially being selected for because of their own benefits. A third suggestion is that different aspects of religion require different evolutionary explanations but also that different evolutionary explanations may apply to several aspects of religion.

Religious behavior often involves significant costs—including economic costs, celibacy, dangerous rituals, or the expending of time that could be used otherwise. This would suggest that natural selection should act against religious behavior unless it or something else causes religious behavior to have significant advantages.

=== Religion as an adaptation ===
Richard Sosis and Candace Alcorta have reviewed several of the prominent theories for the adaptive value of religion. Many are "social solidarity theories", which view religion as having evolved to enhance cooperation and cohesion within groups. Group membership in turn provides benefits which can enhance an individual's chances for survival and reproduction. These benefits range from coordination advantages to the facilitation of costly behavior rules.

Sosis also researched 200 utopian communes in the 19th-century United States, both religious and secular (mostly socialist). 39% of the religious communes were still functioning 20 years after their founding while only 6% of the secular communes were. The number of costly sacrifices that a religious commune demanded from its members had a linear effect on its longevity, while in secular communes demands for costly sacrifices did not correlate with longevity and the majority of the secular communes failed within 8 years. Sosis cites anthropologist Roy Rappaport in arguing that rituals and laws are more effective when sacralized. Social psychologist Jonathan Haidt cites Sosis's research in his 2012 book The Righteous Mind as the best evidence that religion is an adaptive solution to the free-rider problem by enabling cooperation without kinship. Evolutionary medicine researcher Randolph M. Nesse and theoretical biologist Mary Jane West-Eberhard have argued instead that because humans with altruistic tendencies are preferred as social partners they receive fitness advantages by social selection, with Nesse arguing further that social selection enabled humans as a species to become extraordinarily cooperative and capable of creating culture.

Edward O. Wilson's theory of "eusociality" strongly suggests group cohesion as the impetus for the development of religion. Wilson posits that the individuals of a small percentage of species (including homo sapiens, ants, termites, bees and a few other species) replicated their genes by adhering to one of a number of competing groups. He further postulates that, in homo sapiens, thanks to their enormous forebrains, there evolved a complex interplay between group evolution and individual evolution within a group.

These social solidarity theories may help to explain the painful or dangerous nature of many religious rituals. Costly-signaling theory suggests that such rituals might serve as public and hard-to-fake signals that an individual's commitment to the group is sincere. Since there would be a considerable benefit in trying to cheat the system—taking advantage of group-living benefits without taking on any possible costs—the ritual would not be something simple that can be taken lightly. Warfare is a good example of a cost of group living, and Richard Sosis, Howard C. Kress, and James S. Boster carried out a cross-cultural survey which demonstrated that men in societies which engage in war do submit to the costliest rituals.

Studies that show more direct positive associations between religious practice and health and longevity are more controversial. Harold G. Koenig and Harvey J. Cohen summarized and assessed the results of 100 evidence-based studies that systematically examined the relationship between religion and human well-being, finding that 79% showed a positive influence. Such studies rate in mass media, as seen in a 2009 NPR program which covered University of Miami professor Gail Ironson's findings that belief in God and a strong sense of spirituality correlated with a lower viral load and improved immune-cell levels in HIV patients. Richard P. Sloan of Columbia University, in contrast, told the New York Times that "there is no really good compelling evidence that there is a relationship between religious involvement and health." Debate continues over the validity of these findings, which do not necessarily prove a direct cause-and-effect relationship between religion and health. Mark Stibich claims there is a clear correlation but that the reason for it remains unclear. A criticism of such placebo effects, as well as the advantage of religion giving a sense of meaning, is that it seems likely that less complex mechanisms than religious behavior could achieve such goals.

=== Religion as a by-product ===
Stephen Jay Gould cites religion as an example of an exaptation or spandrel, but he does not himself select a definite trait that he thinks natural selection has actually acted on. He does, however, bring up Freud's suggestion that large human brains, which evolved for other reasons, led to consciousness. The beginning of consciousness forced humans to deal with the concept of personal mortality. Religion may have been one solution to this problem.

Other researchers have proposed specific psychological processes that natural selection may have fostered alongside religion. Such mechanisms may include the ability to infer the presence of organisms that might do harm (agent detection), the ability to come up with causal narratives for natural events (etiology), and the ability to recognize that other people have minds of their own with their own beliefs, desires and intentions (theory of mind). These three adaptations (among others) allow human beings to imagine purposeful agents behind many observations that could not readily be explained otherwise, e.g. thunder, lightning, movement of planets, complexity of life.

Pascal Boyer suggests in his book Religion Explained (2001) that there is no simple explanation for religious consciousness. He builds on the ideas of cognitive anthropologists Dan Sperber and Scott Atran, who argued that religious cognition represents a by-product of various evolutionary adaptations, including folk psychology. He argues that one such factor is that it has, in most cases, been advantageous for humans to remember "minimally counter-intuitive" concepts that are somewhat different from the daily routine and somewhat violate innate expectations about how the world is constructed. A god that is in many aspects like humans but much more powerful is such a concept, while the often much more abstract god discussed at length by theologians is often too counter-intuitive. Experiments support that religious people think about their god in anthropomorphic terms even if this contradicts the more complex theological doctrines of their religion.

Pierre Lienard and Pascal Boyer suggest that humans evolved a "hazard-precaution system" which allowed them to detect potential threats in the environment and to attempt to respond appropriately. Several features of ritual behaviors, often a major feature of religion, are held to trigger this system. These include the occasion for the ritual (often the prevention or elimination of danger or evil), the harm believed to result from nonperformance of the ritual, and the detailed prescriptions for proper performance of the ritual. Lienard and Boyer discuss the possibility that a sensitive hazard-precaution system itself may have provided fitness benefits, and that religion then "associates individual, unmanageable anxieties with coordinated action with others and thereby makes them more tolerable or meaningful".

Justin L. Barrett in Why Would Anyone Believe in God? (2004) suggests that belief in God is natural because it depends on mental tools possessed by all human beings. He suggests that the structure and development of human minds make belief in the existence of a supreme god (with properties such as being superknowing, superpowerful and immortal) highly attractive. He also compares belief in God to belief in other minds, and devotes a chapter to looking at the evolutionary psychology of atheism. He suggests that one of the fundamental mental modules in the brain is the Hyperactive Agency Detection Device (HADD), another potential system for identifying danger. This HADD may confer a survival benefit even if it is over-sensitive: it is better to avoid an imaginary predator than to be killed by a real one. This would tend to encourage belief in ghosts and spirits. According to Justin L. Barrett, having a scientific explanation for mental phenomena does not mean we should stop believing in them. "Suppose science produces a convincing account for why I think my wife loves me — should I then stop believing that she does?"

Though hominids probably began using their emerging cognitive abilities to meet basic needs like nutrition and mates, Terror Management Theory argues that this happened before they had reached the point where significant self- (and thus end-of-self-) awareness arose. Awareness of death became a highly disruptive byproduct of prior adaptive functions. The resulting anxiety threatened to undermine these very functions and thus needed amelioration. Any social formation or practice that was to be widely accepted by the masses needed to provide a means of managing such terror. The main strategy to do so was to "become an individual of value in a world of meaning … acquiring self-esteem [via] the creation and maintenance of culture", as this would counter the sense of insignificance represented by death and provide: 1) symbolic immortality through the legacy of a culture that lives on beyond the physical self ("earthly significance") 2) literal immortality, the promise of an afterlife or continued existence featured in religions ("cosmic significance").

Robert Sapolsky isolates potential neurological and evolutionary adjuvants for religious belief.

=== Religion as a meme ===
Richard Dawkins suggests in The Selfish Gene (1976) that cultural memes function like genes in that they are subject to natural selection. In The God Delusion (2006) Dawkins further argues that religious truths cannot be questioned; their very nature encourages religions to spread like "mind viruses". In such a conception, it is necessary that the individuals who are unable to question their beliefs are more biologically fit than individuals who are capable of questioning their beliefs. Thus, in such a conception, sacred scriptures or oral traditions created a behavioral pattern that elevated biological fitness for believing individuals. Individuals who were capable of challenging such beliefs, even if the beliefs were enormously improbable, became rarer and rarer in the population.

This model holds that religion is a byproduct of the cognitive modules in the human brain that arose in the evolutionary past to deal with problems of survival and reproduction. Initial concepts of supernatural agents may arise in the tendency of humans to "overdetect" the presence of other humans or of predators (for example: momentarily mistaking a vine for a snake). For instance, a man might report that he felt something sneaking up on him, but it vanished when he looked around.

Stories of these experiences are especially likely to be retold, passed on and embellished due to their descriptions of standard ontological categories (person, artifact, animal, plant, natural object) with counterintuitive properties (humans that are invisible, houses that remember what happened in them, etc.). These stories become even more salient when they are accompanied by activation of non-violated expectations for the ontological category (houses that "remember" activates humans' intuitive psychology of mind; i.e. we automatically attribute thought processes to them).

As one of the attributes of humans' intuitive psychology of mind, humans are interested in the affairs of other humans. This may result in the tendency for concepts of supernatural agents to inevitably cross-connect with human intuitive moral feelings (evolutionary behavioral guidelines). In addition, the presence of dead bodies creates an uncomfortable cognitive state in which dreams and other mental modules (person-identification and behavior-prediction) continue to run decoupled from reality, producing incompatible intuitions that the dead are somehow still around. When this co-incides with the human predisposition to see misfortune as a social event (as someone's responsibility rather than as the outcome of mechanical processes) it may activate the intuitive "willingness to make exchanges" module of the human theory of minds, compelling the bereaved to try to interact and bargain with supernatural agents (ritual).

In a large enough group, some individuals will seem better skilled at these rituals than others and will become specialists. As societies grow and encounter other societies, competition will ensue and a "survival of the fittest" effect may cause the practitioners to modify their concepts to provide a more abstract, more widely acceptable version. Eventually the specialist practitioners form a cohesive group or guild with its attendant political goals (religion).

== See also ==
- Attachment theory and psychology of religion
- Cognitive fluidity
- Cognitive science of religion
- Genetic fallacy
- Group cohesiveness
- Origin of morality
- Self-sacrifice
