= Religion Explained =

2001 book by Pascal Boyer

Religion Explained: The Evolutionary Origins of Religious Thought
- Cover
- Author: Pascal Boyer
- Language: English
- Subjects: Evolutionary psychology of religion Evolutionary origin of religions
- Publisher: Basic Books
- Publication date: 2001
- Media type: Print
- Pages: 384
- ISBN: 0-465-00696-5
- OCLC: 50628396

Religion Explained: The Evolutionary Origins of Religious Thought is a 2001 book by cognitive anthropologist Pascal Boyer, in which the author discusses the evolutionary psychology of religion and evolutionary origin of religions.

== Summary ==
Boyer describes the genesis of religious concepts as a phenomenon of the mind's cognitive inference systems, comparable to pareidolia and perceptions of religious imagery in natural phenomena resulting from face perception processes within the human brain. Boyer supports this naturalistic origin of religion with evidence from many specialized disciplines including biological anthropology, cultural anthropology, cognitive science, linguistics, evolutionary biology, cognitive psychology, evolutionary psychology, neuroscience, and information processing.

Religion Explained frames religious practices and beliefs in terms of recent cognitive neuroscience research in the modularity of mind. This theory involves cognitive "modules" ("devices" or "subroutines") underlying inference systems and intuitions. For instance, Boyer suggests culturally-widespread beliefs in "supernatural agents" (e.g., gods, ancestors, spirits, and witches) result from agent detection: the intuitive modular process of assuming intervention by conscious agents, regardless of whether they are present. "When we see branches moving in a tree or when we hear an unexpected sound behind us, we immediately infer that some agent is the cause of this salient event. We can do that without any specific description of what the agent actually is." Boyer cites the anthropologist E. E. Evans-Pritchard's classic Zande story about a termite-infested roof collapsing.

For the anthropologist, the house caved in because of the termites. For the Zande, it was quite clear that witchcraft was involved. However, the Zande were also aware that the termites were the proximate cause of the incident. But what they wanted to know was why it happened at that particular time, when particular people were gathered in the house.

Within Boyer's hypothesis, religion is a "parasite" (or "spandrel") offshoot from cognitive modules, comparable to the way the reading process is parasitic upon language modules.

As I have pointed out repeatedly, the building of religious concepts requires mental systems and capacities that are there anyway, religious concepts or not. Religious morality uses moral intuitions, religious notions of supernatural agents recruit our intuitions about agency in general, and so on. This is why I said that religious concepts are parasitic upon other mental capacities. Our capacities to play music, paint pictures or even make sense of printed ink-patterns on a page are also parasitic in this sense. This means that we can explain how people play music, paint pictures and learn to read by examining how mental capacities are recruited by these activities. The same goes for religion. Because the concepts require all sorts of specific human capacities (an intuitive psychology, a tendency to attend to some counterintuitive concepts, as well as various social mind adaptations), we can explain religion by describing how these various capacities get recruited, how they contribute to the features of religion that we find in so many different cultures. We do not need to assume that there is a special way of functioning that occurs only when processing religious thoughts.

Boyer admits his explanation of religion

is not a quick, shoot-from-the-hip solution of the kind that many people, either religious or not, seem to favor. There cannot be a magic bullet to explain the existence and common features of religion, as the phenomenon is the result of aggregate relevance – that is, of successful activation of a whole variety of mental systems.

== Reception ==
Critical reception of Religion Explained has been mixed.

The psychologist Benjamin Beit-Hallahmi called the book "a milestone on the road to a new behavioral understanding of religion, basing itself on what has come to be known as cognitive anthropology, and pointedly ignoring much work done over the past one hundred years in the behavioral study of religion and in the psychological anthropology of religion." He continues:

The clearest virtue of this book is that of dealing with the real thing. Even today, most scholarly work on religion consists of apologetics in one form or another, and we are deluged by offers of grants to study "spirituality" or teach "religion and science". This all serves to make us forget that religion is a collection of fantasies about spirits, and Boyer indeed aims to teach us about the world of the spirits in the grand tradition of the Enlightenment. Any general introduction to the world of the spirits must be ambitious because it hasn't been done and also because it has been done intuitively by all of us.

The journalist David Klinghoffer wrote in National Review that "Boyer's talk of 'religion is suspiciously generic" and describes his work as "professorial noodlings" that attempt to raise the question whether "all religions are somehow the same". He further claims that "debunkers like Boyer ... have their own unconscious motivations (to undermine religious faith, after all, is to set oneself free of its many inconvenient strictures)."

Michael Shermer, founder of The Skeptics Society, described Boyer's book as:

a penetratingly insightful scientific analysis of religion because as an anthropologist he understands that any explanation must take into account the rich diversity of religious practices and beliefs around the world, and as a scientist he knows that any explanatory model must account for this diversity. Boyer is at his ethnographic best in describing the countless peculiar religious rituals he and his anthropological brethren have recorded, and especially in identifying the shortcomings of virtually every explanation for religion ever offered. … As a consequence, however, Boyer himself fails to provide a satisfactory explanation because he knows that religion is not a single entity resulting from a single cause.

Brigitte Schön, a theology professor at the University of Bonn, wrote,

Apart from being fascinating to read and containing many more highly original ideas than could be mentioned here, Religion explained is an important book for a number of reasons. First of all, Boyer is able to present a very dense network of theories which not only explains many religious phenomena but also sets them in relation to each other. The integration of cognitive science research leads to a very realistic model of how religious concepts are processed and communicated, something which has been conspicuously absent from most theories of religion so far. Boyer's account of the natural basis of religion explains very well the persistence and re-emergence of religion even in a secularized environment, as well as the tensions between official and folk religion.

Garry Runciman, sociologist at Trinity College, Cambridge, asked "Are we hardwired for God?"

The diverse beliefs which Boyer cites extend from Apollo and Athena, to shamanism among the Panamanian Cuna, to aliens from remote galaxies allegedly landing in New Mexico. But his central agenda is the particular set of unobservable causal agencies cited in his subtitle, and his primary concern is with the question of how we are to account for beliefs that involve the attribution of conscious agency to beings other than humans and animals of the normal and familiar kind. Such beliefs are, as Boyer says, remarkably widespread, and for all their variant forms the variation is neither limitless nor random. His answer falls into two parts: first, these beliefs have in common a counterintuitive attribution of a certain range of properties to certain kinds of quasihuman beings; second, the explanation of their diffusion and persistence is to be sought not in the extensive anthropological literature about the origins and functions of religion, but in recent advances in developmental, cognitive and evolutionary psychology.

Author and economist Zachary Karabell found stylistic faults. "Boyer's use of cognitive psychology, anthropology and other disciplines does generate a new template for examining old questions. But his method, however compelling, does not save the book from its considerable flaws. To begin with, the writing is frequently impenetrable." He concludes, "Of course, Boyer may be right. Human existence may simply be a story of living, breathing, eating and dying. But by not grappling with the possibility that a nonmaterial realm exists, Boyer has written a book about religion that is occasionally illuminating and utterly unconvincing."

The comparative religion author Karen Armstrong reviewed Boyer's thesis.

Religion, he argues, is nothing more or less than a by-product of the human mind. It is a side effect of having a particular kind of brain. By far the most fascinating part of this highly accessible and informative book is Boyer's description of the way our minds work. We have an inbuilt set of ontological expectations and a tendency to dwell on intuitions which violate these, such as mountains that float or companions whom we do not see. From the dawn of modern consciousness, men and women have focused on certain imaginary personalities that transcend the norm, convinced that they can help them in strategic ways. These supernatural agents link with other mental systems, such as our moral intuitions and social categories, for which we can find no conceptual justification.

John Habgood, formerly Archbishop of York, wrote.

This is a bold and far-reaching book. What its author lacks in modesty, he makes up for in cogency of argument and elegance of style. His "explanation" of religion is lucid, entertaining, full of valuable insights and almost, but not quite, convincing. The usual explanations of religion—as an attempt to explain what is otherwise puzzling, as a provider of comfort, as a good thing for society or as an escape from reason—are quickly dismissed. Pascal Boyer seeks to demonstrate that its origins and motivations are more deep seated in our mental structures than any of these, which is why religion is so universal, so powerful and so unlikely to disappear even though, as he also claims, it is in the end only a mental phenomenon. Recent experience of the dreadful consequences of religious fanaticism gives his analysis a frightening contemporary relevance, not least because of the minor role within religion that he assigns to rationality.

== Editions and translations ==
Boyer's book is available in several English versions, as well as Finnish, French, German, Greek, Italian and Polish translations. Publishers have variously altered the Religion Explained title.

The American edition was published as:

- Religion Explained: The Human Instincts That Fashion Gods, Spirits and Ancestors, hardcover, Basic Books, 2001, ISBN 0-465-00695-7.
- Religion Explained: The Human Instincts That Fashion Gods, Spirits and Ancestors, paperback, Vintage, 2002, ISBN 0-09-928276-3.
- Religion Explained, paperback, Basic Books, 2002, ISBN 0-465-00696-5.

The British edition, which changed the subtitle from "The Evolutionary Origins of Religious Thought" to "The Human Instincts That Fashion Gods, Spirits and Ancestors", was published as:

- Religion Explained: The Human Instincts That Fashion Gods, Spirits and Ancestors, hardcover, William Heinemann Ltd, 2001, ISBN 0-465-00695-7.
- Religion Explained: The Human Instincts That Fashion Gods, Spirits and Ancestors, paperback, Vintage, 2002, ISBN 0-09-928276-3.

Translated editions of Religion Explained are available in several European languages:

- Finnish translation by Tiina Arppe as Ja ihminen loi jumalat: kuinka uskonto selitetään [And Man Created the Gods: How to Explain Religion], WSOY 2007, ISBN 978-951-0-31815-7.
- French translation by Claude-Christine Farny as Et l'homme créa les dieux: Comment expliquer la religion [And Man Created the Gods: How to Explain Religion], Paris: Robert Laffont, 2001, ISBN 978-2-221-09046-6.
- German translation by Ulrich Enderwitz, Monika Noll, and Rolf Schubert as Und Mensch schuf Gott [And Man Created God], Klett-Cotta, 2004, ISBN 978-3-608-94032-9.
- Greek translation by Dimitris Xygalatas and Nikolas Roubekas as Και ο Άνθρωπος Έπλασε τους Θεούς [And Man Created the Gods], Thessaloniki: Vanias, 2008. ISBN 978-960-288-225-2.
- Italian translation by Donatella Sutera Sardo as "E l'uomo creò gli dei. Come spiegare la religione" [And man created the Gods. How to Explain Religion], Bologna, Odoya, 2010 ISBN 978-88-6288-073-2.
- Polish translation by Krystyna Szeżyńska-Maćkowiak as I człowiek stworzył bogów... [And man created the gods...], Warsaw, 2005, ISBN 83-7337-985-1.
- Dutch translation by Leo Gillet as "Godsdienst verklaard", Amsterdam: De Bezige Bij, 2002 ISBN 90-234-7083-4 .
- Russian translation by Mariya Desyatova as "Объясняя религию. Природа религиозного мышления" [Religion Explained. Nature of religious thinking], Moscow: Alpina nonfiction, 2016 ISBN 978-5-91671-632-0.

== See also ==
- Memetics
