= International Association for the Cognitive Science of Religion =

Cognitive science organization

- Abbreviation: IACESR
- Formation: 2006; 20 years ago
- Affiliations: International Association for the History of Religions, American Academy of Religion
- Website: www.iacesr.com

The International Association for the Cognitive and Evolutionary Sciences of Religion (IACESR), founded in 2006, is a scholarly association dedicated to the promotion of the Cognitive Science of Religion. The IACSR is an interdisciplinary association, including scholars from a wide variety of disciplines in the human, social, natural and health sciences that are interested in the academic, scientific study of religious phenomena. The IACSR seeks to advance the naturalistic study of religion. It is strictly scientific and does not encourage or welcome those who are interested in dialogue between science and religion, attempt to find religion in science and science in religion, or attempt to validate religious or spiritual doctrines through cognitive science.

The IACESR supports the Electronic Archive for Religion & Cognition at the Centre for Religion & Cognition, Groningen, the Journal of Cognition & Culture (Brill Publishers), and two-book series, Scientific Studies of Religion: Inquiry and Explanation (Bloomsbury Academic), which was formerly the series Cognitive Science of Religion (AltaMira Press), and Religion, Cognition and Culture (Equinox Press).

== History ==
The IACESR was founded in 2006 as the International Association for the Cognitive Science of Religion (IACSR), and the inaugural meeting took place in Aarhus University, in Denmark.The name of the association was changed to The International Association for the Cognitive and Evolutionary Sciences of Religion (IACESR) in 2020.

First General Assembly: January 7, 2006, Aarhus University, Denmark.

Second General Assembly: May 30, 2008, Aarhus University, Denmark.

Third General Assembly: August 16, 2010, University of Toronto, Canada.

Fourth General Assembly: June 25, 2012, Aarhus University, Denmark.

Fifth General Assembly: June 20, 2014, LEVYNA, Masaryk University, Brno, Czech Republic.

Sixth General Assembly: August 22, 2016, University of British Columbia, Vancouver, Canada.

Seventh General Assembly: August 12–16, 2018, Boston, MA, USA.

Eighth General Assembly: September 21, Aarhus University, Denmark.

Other IACESR meetings:

July 29, 2009, at the Free University of Amsterdam, in conjunction with the annual meeting of the Cognitive Science Society.

== Past presidents ==
2006-2008: E. Thomas Lawson, honorary professor, Institute of Cognition and Culture, Queen's University Belfast

2008-2010: Luther H. Martin, University of Vermont

2010-2012: Robert N. McCauley, Kenan University Professor of Philosophy, Emory University

2012-2014: Armin W. Geertz, Aarhus University

2014-2016: Joseph Bulbulia, Maclaurin Goodfellow Chair, University of Auckland

2016-2018: Ann Taves, Professor, Department of Religious Studies, University of California, Santa Barbara

2018-2020: Dimitris Xygalatas, Assistant Professor, University of Connecticut

2020-2022: John H. Shaver, Lecturer, University of Otago

2022-2024: Jon Lanman, Queen's University Belfast

== See also ==
- Cognitive science of religion
- Cognitive science
- Cognitive anthropology
- Religious studies
