= Delhi School of Social Work =

- दिल्ली स्कूल आफ सोशल वर्क
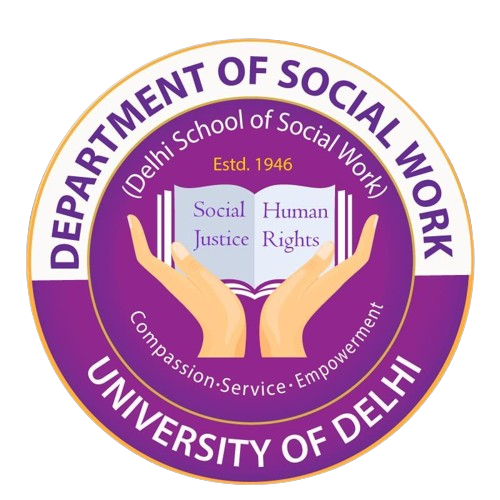
- Type: Public
- Established: 1946; 80 years ago
- Parent institution: University of Delhi
- Head of Department: Prof. Neena Pandey
- Postgraduates: 250
- Doctoral students: 12
- Location: New Delhi, Delhi, India
- Campus: Urban
- Website: www.du.ac.in

Delhi School of Social Work (DSSW) is a public institute of social work education located in Delhi, India. It comes under the aegis of University of Delhi and is formally known as the Department of Social Work (DSW). Established in August 1946 as The National Y.W.C.A. School of Social Work at Lucknow, Uttar Pradesh and became the second school of social work in India after Tata Institute of Social Sciences.

== History ==
DSSW was established in August 1946 as The National Y.W.C.A. School of Social Work at Lucknow, Uttar Pradesh and became the second school of social work in India after Tata Institute of Social Sciences. It was set up by the Y.W.C.A. of India, Burma and Ceylon (which is now known as National Y.W.C.A. of India) with substantial assistance from the Foreign Division of the Y.W.C.A. of the United States. It started a one-year programme to give training in social work to the women who were demobilised by the armed services, known as the Women's Auxiliary Corps of India. Nora Ventura, who was then the Secretary of Religious Education Committee of the Y.W.C.A., took the directorship of the school, which had two students – one from Sindh and the other from Bengal. Towards the end of 1946, Elmina R. Lucke of Y.W.C.A. took over as the consultant organiser of the school.

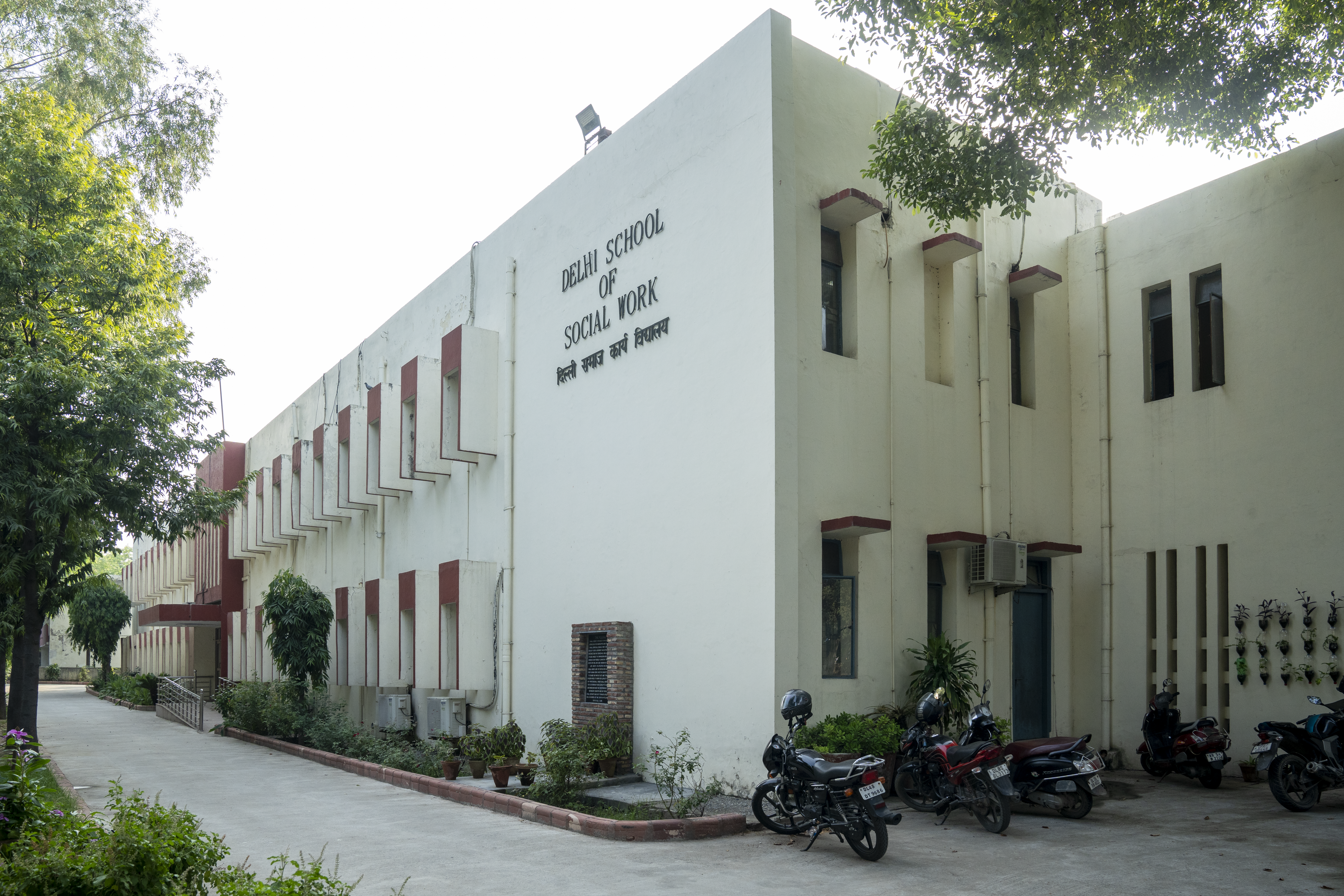
A landscape shot of Department building

In 1948, the school was shifted to Delhi with the support of Maurice Gwyer, then vice-chancellor of the University of Delhi, and started offering social work courses of varying duration. It functioned from the old Air Force Barracks located on the corner of the Mall Road at 3 – University Road. By March 1949, the school became an "autonomous post-graduate institution of the Faculty of Social Service of the University of Delhi" and the name was changed to Delhi School of Social Work. Dorothy Moses was appointed as the first principal of the school. DSSW was managed by Delhi School of Social Work Society with representatives of the Y.W.C.A, the Ministries of Education and Health and the University of Delhi in its board. In 1953, Moses left the school to take up an assignment on behalf of the UNESCO in Ceylon. M. S. Gore succeeded Moses as principal, and served the institution until 1962. During the tenure of S. N. Ranade, DSSW witnessed its larger integration with the University of Delhi. In April 1961 DSSW was taken over by University of Delhi, with its PhD program and M.Phil. program beginning in 1965 and 1976 respectively. In 1979 Delhi School of Social Work (DSSW) became the Department of Social Work, University of Delhi.

In 2008, the Department of Social Work (DSW) initiated a flood relief and rehabilitation project called UDAI (University for Development Action and Integrated learning) for 2008 Bihar flood victims under the aegis of University of Delhi In the same year, National AIDS Control Organisation (NACO) set up its State Training and Resource Centre (STRC) at DSW for the capacity building of partner organizations implementing Targeted Intervention projects for High Risk Groups (HRG) of HIV with Delhi State AIDS Control Society. A Gender Resource Centre was granted by the Governing Council of Mission Convergence under the Chief Secretary, Government of NCT of Delhi to the Centre for Community Development and Action in 2009, under the auspices of the DSSW Society. Also, in 2009 the semester system was introduced in the M.A. Social Work programme. In 2014, University Grants Commission (UGC) sanctioned the status of “Centre of Advanced Study in Social Work” to the Department of Social Work, University of Delhi for five years in this regard. In the year 2018, the Department introduced Choice Based Credit System to its curriculum. In India Today and Outlook-ICARE 2023, the Department has been ranked at 3rd position in the year 2023-24 amongst best colleges/Departments of Social Work all over India.

== Department Resources & Infrastructure ==
=== Library ===
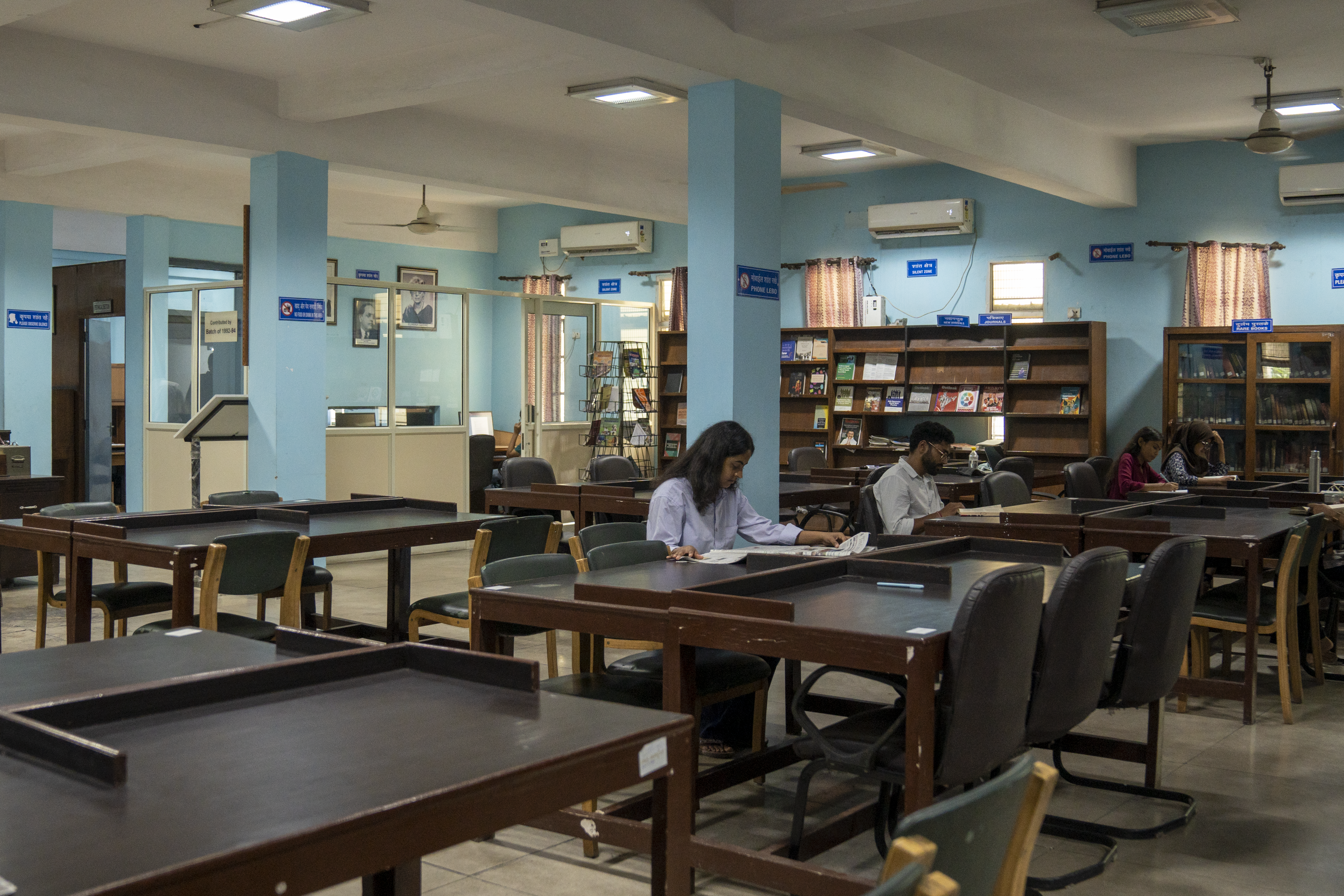
Department Library

The library subscribes regularly to 12 national academic and practice journals. At present, the total collection of resources in the library stands at over 33,466 (including books, dissertation and thesis).

=== Department Council ===
The Department Council met regularly during the year to deliberate and collectively address the academic, pedagogical, field work and allied administrative issues. During these meetings, the faculty members also shared their academic experiences, contributions, upcoming research and academic opportunities. Dr. Sudhir Maske took over as the Secretary, Department Council for the year 2023-2024 under the Chairpersonship of Prof. Sanjoy Roy, Head of the Department.

=== Department of Social Work Hostel ===
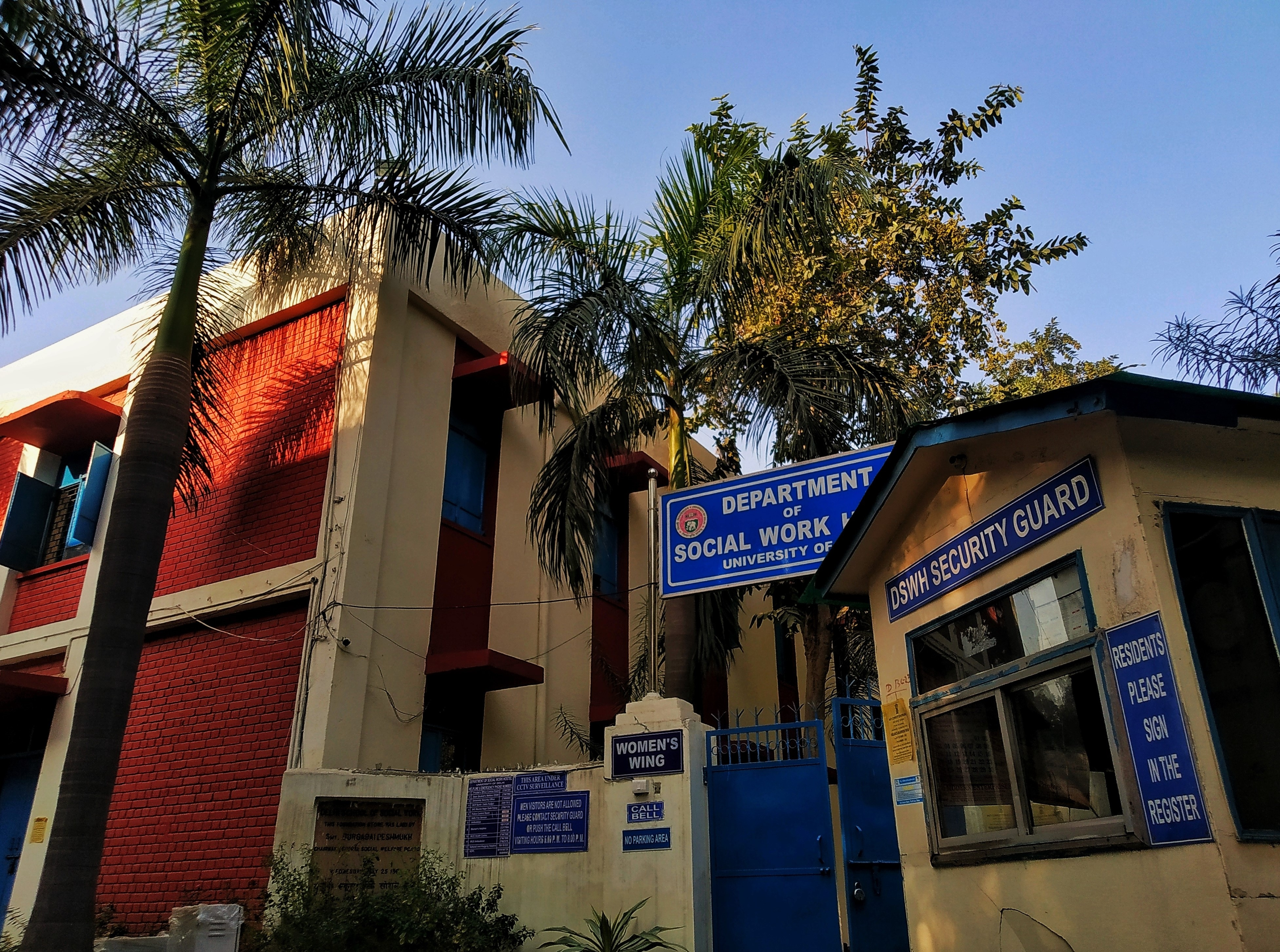
Delhi School of Social Work Hostel

The Department has its own hostel. The Head of the Department is the provost of the hostel. The foundation stone of this hostel was laid by Mrs. Durgabai Deshmukh, Chairman, Central Social Welfare Board, Government of India on 25 July 1962. The Hostel became functional from 16 July 1966.

The hostel campus is quite friendly towards persons with disabilities. Its entrance has been modified and fitted with ramps to suit their special needs. There are forty-nine rooms; a students‟ managed mess with well-furnished kitchen and dining facilities, three drinking water points with reverse osmosis filtering facilities, an air conditioned common room, two sick/isolation rooms (one in each wing), a meeting room, office rooms, Warden‟s residence, lush green lawns, groves and gardens, a bore well in addition to municipal water supply, CCTV surveillance in addition to security services, TV with DTH services in the common room, and a number of newspapers, magazines and periodicals. DSW Hostel has its own website in which provides information about the hostel. There is a provision for security in the Department campus throughout the day. For the hostel, there is additional security during the night time. Two security guards daily provide their services in two shifts daily. Fire safety measures are also in place.

=== Students’ Union ===
The Students‟ Union of the Department of Social Work is a democratically elected student body with active participation in all the academic and co-curricular activities of the Department. The Union provides a platform for the students to take up initiatives to contribute to the academic and extra-curricular life of the Department. The office bearers of the Union act as a communication bridge between the students and the academic and administrative staff for effective functioning of the Department. The election to the Student Union was held in 2023 after a gap of three years.

== Notable alumni ==
- Nandita Das, an award-winning Indian film actress and director
- Anjana Om Kashyap, Indian journalist
- Panduranga Hegde, environmentalist, Chipko Movement leader
- Usha Narayanan, First Lady of India (1997 to 2002)
- Malvika Iyer, motivational speaker and disability rights activist
- Manoj Jha, politician and member of Upper House of Indian Parliament (Rajya Sabha)

== Rankings and reputation ==
In India Today and Outlook-ICARE 2023, the Department has been ranked at 3rd position in the year 2023-24 amongst best colleges/Departments of Social Work all over India.

== See also ==
List of social work schools
