= Justin L. Barrett =

American experimental psychologist (born 1971)

Justin L. Barrett (born 1971) is an American experimental psychologist, founder and president of Blueprint 1543, a nonprofit organization. He formerly was the Director of the Thrive Center for Human Development in Pasadena, California, Thrive Professor of Developmental Science, and Professor of Psychology at Fuller Graduate School of Psychology. He previously was a senior researcher and director of the Centre for Anthropology and Mind at the Institute for Cognitive and Evolutionary Anthropology, University of Oxford.

== Career ==
Barrett earned a B.A. in psychology from Calvin College and a Ph.D in experimental psychology (cognitive and developmental focus) from Cornell University. He served on the psychology faculties of Calvin College and the University of Michigan (Ann Arbor), and as a research fellow of the Institute for Social Research.

Barrett is a founding editor of the Journal of Cognition & Culture and is author of numerous articles and chapters concerning the cognitive science of religion.

== Views on evolution of religious belief ==
Barrett is described in the New York Times as a "prominent member of the byproduct camp" and "an observant Christian who believes in "an all-knowing, all-powerful, perfectly good God who brought the universe into being," [and] "that the purpose for people is to love God and love each other." He considers that "Christian theology teaches that people were crafted by God to be in a loving relationship with him and other people. Why wouldn't God, then, design us in such a way as to find belief in divinity quite natural?" Having a scientific explanation for mental phenomena does not mean we should stop believing in them. "Suppose science produces a convincing account for why I think my wife loves me—should I then stop believing that she does?"

== Why Would Anyone Believe in God? ==
In his book Why Would Anyone Believe in God? he suggests that "belief in God is an almost inevitable consequence of the kind of minds we have. Most of what we believe comes from mental tools working below our conscious awareness. And what we believe consciously is in large part driven by these unconscious beliefs." and "that beliefs in gods match up well with these automatic assumptions; beliefs in an all-knowing, all-powerful God match up even better."

== See also ==
- Christianity and science
- Cognitive science of religion
- Evolutionary origins of religion
- Psychology of religion

== Books ==
- Why Would Anyone Believe in God? (AltaMira, 2004) presents an account for the prevalence of religious beliefs, based in the field of Cognitive Science. It represents the field's first relatively comprehensive introduction intended for a general audience.
- Cognitive Science, Religion, and Theology (Templeton Press, 2011) is the eighth title published in the Templeton Science and Religion Series, in which scientists from a wide range of fields distill their experience and knowledge into brief tours of their respective specialties.
- Born Believers: The Science of Childhood Religion (The Free Press, 2012)
- Thriving With Stone Age Minds: Evolutionary Psychology, Christian Faith, and the Quest for Human Flourishing [written with Pamela Ebstyne King] (InterVarsity Press, 2021)

== Selected articles ==
- "Cognitive Science of Religion: What is it and Why is it?" Religion Compass 1, 6 (2007). Provides a brief review of cognitive science and religion.
- "Exploring the Natural Foundations of Religion," Trends in Cognitive Sciences, 2000, vol.4 pp 29–34
