= Indian Sociological Society =

- Formation: 1951
- Headquarters: New Delhi, India
- Website: www.insoso.org

Indian Sociological Society (ISS) is a professional body of sociologists in India. It publishes academic research journals, the Sociological Bulletin in English and the Bhartiya Samajshastra Sameeksha in Hindi language.

== History ==
In December 1951, the Indian Sociological Society was registered in Bombay by an initiative of its Founder-President (1951-1966), Prof. G. S. Ghurye, who was then Head of the Department of Sociology at University of Bombay. Prof. J. V. Fereira and Prof. K. M. Kapadia were the founding Secretaries.

== Activities ==
=== Lifetime Achievement Awards ===
From time to time, ISS grants the Lifetime Achievement Award to those who contribute to the advancement of knowledge and research in the field of sociology.

=== Publication of academic journals ===
From March 1952, ISS started publishing a biannual english language academic research journal titled Sociological Bulletin. From January 2014, ISS started publishing a hindi language academic research journal titled Bhartiya Samajshastra Sameeksha.

=== Seminars ===
It occasionally holds seminars/workshops on selected themes of National Importance. For example, its Diamond Jubilee seminar was attended by over 2000 sociologists from several nations across the world, which was inaugurate by the Vice President of India, Hamid Ansari.

== See also ==
- Indian Council of Social Science Research (ICSSR)
- The Indian Sociologist
- Tata Institute of Social Sciences
