= Studien und Forschungen zur Menschen- und Völkerkunde =

German anthropological and ethnological book series

Studien und Forschungen zur Menschen- und Völkerkunde (“Studies and Research on Anthropology and Ethnology”) is a German anthropological–ethnological book series published under the scholarly direction of the German ethnologist Georg Buschan (1863–1942). The series was published from 1907 onward by the publishing house Strecker & Schröder in Stuttgart and continued until shortly after the First World War.

The first volume is Die Schiffahrt der Indianer (“The Navigation of the Indigenous Peoples”) by Georg Friederici, and the eighth was written by the Jewish physician and racial scientist Samuel Weissenberg (1867-1928), volume 8 was written by the Polish anatomist, anthropologist, and eugenicist Edward Loth (1884-1944). Volume 6/7 Die Stellung der Pygmäenvölker in der Entwicklungsgeschichte der Menschen (“The Position of the Pygmy Peoples in the Evolutionary History of Humanity”) was written by the SVD Father W. Schmidt (1868-1954) - the leading representative of the Vienna School of Ethnology, a Catholic-theological variant of the “culture-circle theory” (Kulturkreislehre); with key concepts like Urmonotheismus, Hochgott belief, and Urreligion. The Festschrift for Eduard Hahn on His 60th Birthday (Volume 14) includes, among other contributions, works by the eugenicist Eugen Fischer (1874–1967) and by Leo Frobenius, one of the main representatives of the Kulturkreis theory.

Buschan's main work was Illustrierte Völkerkunde (“Illustrated Ethnology”; 3 vols., Stuttgart 1910, 1922, 1926), produced with the collaboration of numerous experts in the field – Felix von Luschan, Robert Heine-Geldern, Richard Lasch, Walter Krickeberg, Arthur Haberlandt, Arthur Byhan, Wilhelm Volz, Michael Haberlandt – , which in his time was regarded as the most important comprehensive scientific presentation of the discipline.

The works are as a whole closely intertwined with the ethnological theories of their time (f.e. race theories) and with both German and international colonial history.

== Volumes (selection) ==
The volumes are (in selection):

- 1. Die Schiffahrt der Indianer. Georg Friederici. 1907
- 2. Die morphologische Abstammung des Menschen. J. H. F. Kohlbrugge. 1908
- 3. Der Einfluß der römischen Kultur auf die germanische im Spiegel der Hügelgräber des Niederrheins. Nebst einem Anhang: Die absolute Chronologie der Augenfibel. Albert Kiekebusch. 1908
- 4. Die Kultur der Pueblos in Arizona und New Mexico. Heinrich Eickhoff. 1908
- 5. Der Eid. Seine Entstehung und Beziehung zu Glaube und Brauch der Naturvölker. Eine ethnologische Studie. Richard Lasch. 1908
- 6./7. Die Stellung der Pygmäenvölker in der Entwicklungsgeschichte der Menschen. P. W. Schmidt. 1910
- 8. Das Wachstum der Menschen nach Alter, Geschlecht, Rasse. S. Weissenberg. 1911
- 9. Beiträge zur Anthropologie der Negerweichteile (Muskelsystem). Edward Loth. 1912
- 10. Die Völker Europas zur jüngeren Steinzeit - Ihre Herkunft und Zusammensetzung. K. Classen. 1912
- 11. Elementargedanke und Übertragungstheorie in der Völkerkunde. Julius Eisenstädter. 1912
- 12. Die Küsten- und Bergvölker der Gazellehalbinsel: ein Beitrag zur Völkerkunde von Neuguinea unter bes. Hervorhebung rechtlicher und sozialer Einrichtungen. Friedrich Burger. 1913
- 13. Die Völkerschaften der Schweiz von der Urzeit bis zur Gegenwart. Franz Schwerz. 1915
- 14. Hugo Mötefindt, Alfred Vierkandt und Walther Vogel (Red.): Festschrift Eduard Hahn zum 60. Geburtstag dargebracht von Freunden u. Schülern. 1917 (mit einem Schriftenverzeichnis des Jubilars, Beiträgen von Eugen Fischer über Haustiere, Vierkandt über Ernährung, Max Hilzheimer, Leo Frobenius über kabylische Volkserzählung u.a.) - Content
- 15. Über den Ursprung der Germanen. Karl Classen. 1920

== See also ==
- Anthropos-Bibliothek
