= Anthropos-Bibliothek =

Roman Catholic anthropological book series

The Anthropos-Bibliothek ("Anthropos Library"), with French title: Bibliothèque Anthropos, is a Catholic series of publications in religious studies, ethnology, and linguistics. It was issued in connection with the journal Anthropos – Internationale Zeitschrift für Völker- und Sprachenkunde (International Review of Ethnology and Linguistics) and was originally intended as a platform for Catholic missionary scholarship.

The Anthropos Library was founded by the SVD Fathers Wilhelm Schmidt, Ferdinand Hestermann and Wilhelm Koppers, leading representatives of the Vienna School of Ethnology, a Catholic-theological variant of the "culture-circle theory" (Kulturkreislehre). The key concepts include Urmonotheismus, Hochgott belief, and Urreligion. The series contains substantial monographic studies, often representing the life's work of scholars from various religious orders as well as lay researchers. More than thirty volumes were published.

From 1909 onward the series appeared in Münster at Aschendorff, with two subseries: the Ethnological Anthropos Library (Bibliothèque ethnologique Anthropos) and the Linguistic Anthropos Library (Bibliothèque linguistique Anthropos). It was later also published at St. Gabriel, Mödling by the international journal Anthropos. The series continued until the beginning of the Second World War; the last known volume was Paul Arndt's Soziale Verhältnisse auf Ost-Flores, Adonate und Solor (Münster, 1940).

The volumes of the Anthropos Library (and its subseries) are not to be confused with the journal Anthropos (published since 1906) or with the later Anthropos-Bibliothek held at the Mission House St. Augustin.

== Background ==
The first volumes were published in Münster (Münster i. W.), where Joseph Schmidlin (1876–1944), one of the founders of Catholic mission studies, taught. In 1911 the same publisher (Aschendorff) also launched the Zeitschrift für Missionswissenschaft.

Within the series' Expedition volumes, three volumes on the indigenous inhabitants of Tierra del Fuego ("Feuerland-Indianer") by the missionary-ethnologist Martin Gusinde (Die Selk'nam, Die Yamana, and Anthropologie der Feuerland-Indianer) appeared in 1931, 1937, and 1939.

In a 1956 article in Anthropos, titled "Professor Pater Wilhelm Schmidt S.V.D. – A Tribute to His Life's Work", Wilhelm Koppers wrote (here in English translation):

It did not take long before W. Schmidt found himself compelled to create new possibilities for publication. He established a linguistic and ethnological "Anthropos" Library, within which the larger monographic works (often representing the life's work of missionary and lay researchers) were to be published. By the year 1938, more than thirty volumes had been issued in this way.

To train researchers in the field especially missionaries more effectively and to introduce them systematically to the problems that were foremost at the time, and furthermore to bring scholars at home into a lively and fruitful contact with the researchers in the field, Schmidt, together with the French Jesuit Fr. Bouvier (who was later succeeded by P. Henri Pinard de la Boullaye), initiated International Courses for the Ethnology of Religion. These courses were successfully held five times between 1922 and 1929 twice in Leuven, and once each in Tilburg, Milan, and Luxembourg.

W. Schmidt had concluded his work on the Pygmies published in 1910 with an urgent call for research on the pygmies.

== Volumes (selection) ==
The following overview of individual volumes of the Anthropos Library is not exhaustive. ("I.1" = vol. 1, fasc. 1 / French: Tom. I, Fasc. 1.)

=== Ethnologische Anthropos-Bibliothek ===
Ethnologische Anthropos-Bibliothek: Internationale Sammlung ethnologischer Monographien (Bibliothèque ethnologique Anthropos: Collection internationale de monographies ethnologiques):

Volume I

- I.1 Meier, P. Jos. M.S.C.: Mythen und Erzählungen der Küstenbewohner der Gazelle-Halbinsel (Neu-Pommern). Im Urtext aufgezeichnet und ins Deutsche übertragen. Münster: Aschendorffsche Buchhandlung 1909. Mit einem Vorwort von P. W. Schmidt, S.V.D. (digital copy)
- I.2 Jos. Henry: Les Bambara: L'âme d'un peuple africain ; Leur vie psychique, éthique, sociale, religieuse. Münster: Aschendorff 1910.
- I.3 Gerhard Peekel: Religion und Zauberei auf dem mittleren Neu-Mecklenburg (Bismarck-Archipel, Südsee). 1910 (digital copy)
- I.4 Henry Trilles: Le Totémisme chez les Fân. Par le R. P. H. Trilles. Avec préf. de A. LeRoy. Münster: Aschendorff 1912. (digital copy)
- I.5 Alfred Liétard: Au Yun-Nan. Les Lo-Lo P'o. Une tribu des aboriginales de la Chine Méridionale. Münster, Aschendorff, 1913.

Volume II

- II.1 P. A. Erdland: Die Marshall-Insulaner: Leben und Sitte, Sinn und Religion eines Südsee-Volkes. Münster i. W. 1914 (digital copy)
- II.2 Friedrich J. Bieber: Kaffa, ein altkuschitisches Volkstum in Inner-Afrika: Nachrichten über Land und Volk, Brauch und Sitte der Kaffitscho oder Gouga und das Kaiserreich Kaffa: Band 1: Das Eigenleben der Kaffitscho oder Gonga. Münster i. W., Aschendorff 1920 (digital copy, Band I)
- II.3 Friedrich J. Bieber: Kaffa, ein altkuschitisches Volkstum in Inner-Afrika. Band 2: Das Gemeinleben der Kaffitscho oder Gonga, Wien 1923, St. Gabriel, Mödling bei Wien, Verlag der Administration des Anthropos
- II.5 Wilhelm Hofmayr: Die Schilluk: Geschichte, Religion und Leben eines Niloten-Stammes. Nach P. Banholzers und eigenen Aufzeichnungen dargestellt von Wilhelm Hofmayr. St. Gabriel, Mödling bei Wien, Verlag der Administration des Anthropos 1925

Volume III

- III.1 Laurentius Bollig: Die Bewohner der Truk-Inseln: Religion, Leben und kurze Grammatik eines Mikronesiervolkes. Münster i.W., Aschendorff, 1927.
- III.2 Fr. Bösch: Les Banyamwezi. Peuple de l'Afrique Orientale. Münster: Aschendorff 1930
- III.3 Paul Leser: Entstehung und Verbreitung des Pfluges. Mit 351 Abbildungen im Satz und 42 auf Tafeln. Münster, Aschendorffsche Verlagsbuchhandlung 1931.
- III.4 Henry Trilles: Les Pygmées de la forêt équatoriale: Cours professé à l'Institut catholique de Paris. Avec une préface du R. P. Pinard de la Boullaye, S. J., et introduction du R. P. Schmidt, S. V. D. Paris: Bloud & Gay – Münster: Aschendorff 1932. digital copy
- III.5 Heinz Reschke: Linguistische Untersuchung der Mythologie und Initiation in Neuguinea. Münster: Aschendorffsche Verl.-buchhandlung, 1935 (Diss. 1934).

Volume 4

- IV.1 Bernhard Andreas Gregorius Vroklage: Die sozialen Verhältnisse Indonesiens. Teil: Bd. 1., Borneo, Celebes und Molukken. Münster: Aschendorff. 1936.
- IV.2 Paul Arndt: Soziale Verhältnisse auf Ost-Flores, Adonate und Solor. Münster: Aschendorff 1940.

=== Linguistische Anthropos-Bibliothek ===
Linguistische Anthropos-Bibliothek (Internationale Sammlung linguistischer Monographien)

- I: P. Fr. Vormann, S. V. D., und P. Wilh. Scharfenberg, S. V. D.: Die Monumbo-Sprache. Grammatik und Wörterverzeichnis. Mit Einleitung und Anhang von P. F. Hestermann. Mechitharisten-Buchdruckerei, Wien, 1914
- II: P. A. Grignard, S. J.: An Oraon-English Dictionary in the roman character with numerous phrases illustrative of sense and idiom and notes on tribal customs, beliefs etc., St. Gabriel-Mödling: Admin. d. Anthropos 1924
- III: P. A. Moreira, S. J.: Grammatical Notes of the Sena Language.
- IV: P. Dr. G. Royen, O. F. M.: Die nominalen Klassifikationssysteme in den Sprachen der Erde. Mödling b. Wien: Admin. d. Anthropos 1929
- V: Mullie, Jos[eph]. Het Chineesch taaleigen: inleiding tot de gesprokene taal (Noord-Pekineesch dialekt) [Die chinesische Sprache: Einführung in die gesprochene Sprache (Nordpekinesischer Dialekt)]. Vol. 1 (Pei-p'ing : Drukkerij der Lazaristen, 1930.
- VI: P. J. Mullie: Het Chineesch Taaleigen. Dritter Teil. Pei-p'ing: Drukkerij der Lazaristen 1931
- VII: P. J. Mullie: Het Chineesch Taaleigen. Dritter Teil. Pei-p'ing: Drukkerij der Lazaristen 1933.
- VIII: Rev. James Williams: Grammar Notes and Vocabulary of the Language of the Makuchi Indians of Guiana. Mödling: Verl. d. internat. Zeitschrift "Anthropos", 1932.
- IX: P. A. G. Morice, O. M. I.: The Carrier Language (Déné Family). Vol. I. [(Déné Family); A grammar and dictionary combined]. Mödling b. Wien: Verl. [Admin.] d. "Anthropos" 1932.
- X: P. A. G. Morice, O. M. I.: The Carrier Language (Déné Family). Vol. II. Mödling b. Wien: Verl. [Admin.] d. "Anthropos" 1932.
- XI: P. Chrysost. Stromer, O. F. M.: Die Sprache der Mundurukú. Wörterbuch, Grammatik und Texte eines Indianeridioms am oberen Tapajoz, Amazonasgebiet. Mödling: Verl. d. internat. Zeitschrift "Anthropos", 1932
- XII: P. Mor. Vanoverbergh, C.I.C.M.: A Dictionary of Lepanto Igorot or Kankanay as it is spoken at Bauco. Mödling: "Anthropos", 1933
- XIII: P. J. P. Crazzolara, F. S. C.: Outlines of a Nuer Grammar. Mödling: "Anthropos", 1933
- XIV Gertrud Kettler (Gertrud Pätsch): Das Verbum finitum in der altgeorgischen Übersetzung des Markus-Evangeliums. Münster i. Westf. 1938. (Münster, Phil. Diss., 1938)

=== Expeditionsserie ===
- Martin Gusinde: Die Feuerland-Indianer. Mödling bei Wien: Verl. [Administration] d. Internat. Zeitsch. "Anthropos"

Bd. 1. Die Selk'nam. 1931
Bd. 2. Die Yamana. 1937
Bd. 3. Anthropologie der Feuerland-Indianer. 1939

== Glossary (Anthropos) ==
The following glossary (partly in German) provides a brief overview of the various "Anthropos" locations associated with the publication of the Anthropos-Bibliothek (in Münster i. Westph., Mödling near Vienna, Posieux, Fribourg (Switzerland), Sankt Augustin, Beijing, and others). These sites formed – and in some cases still form – central institutions for ethnological and missionary-science research, particularly within the SVD.

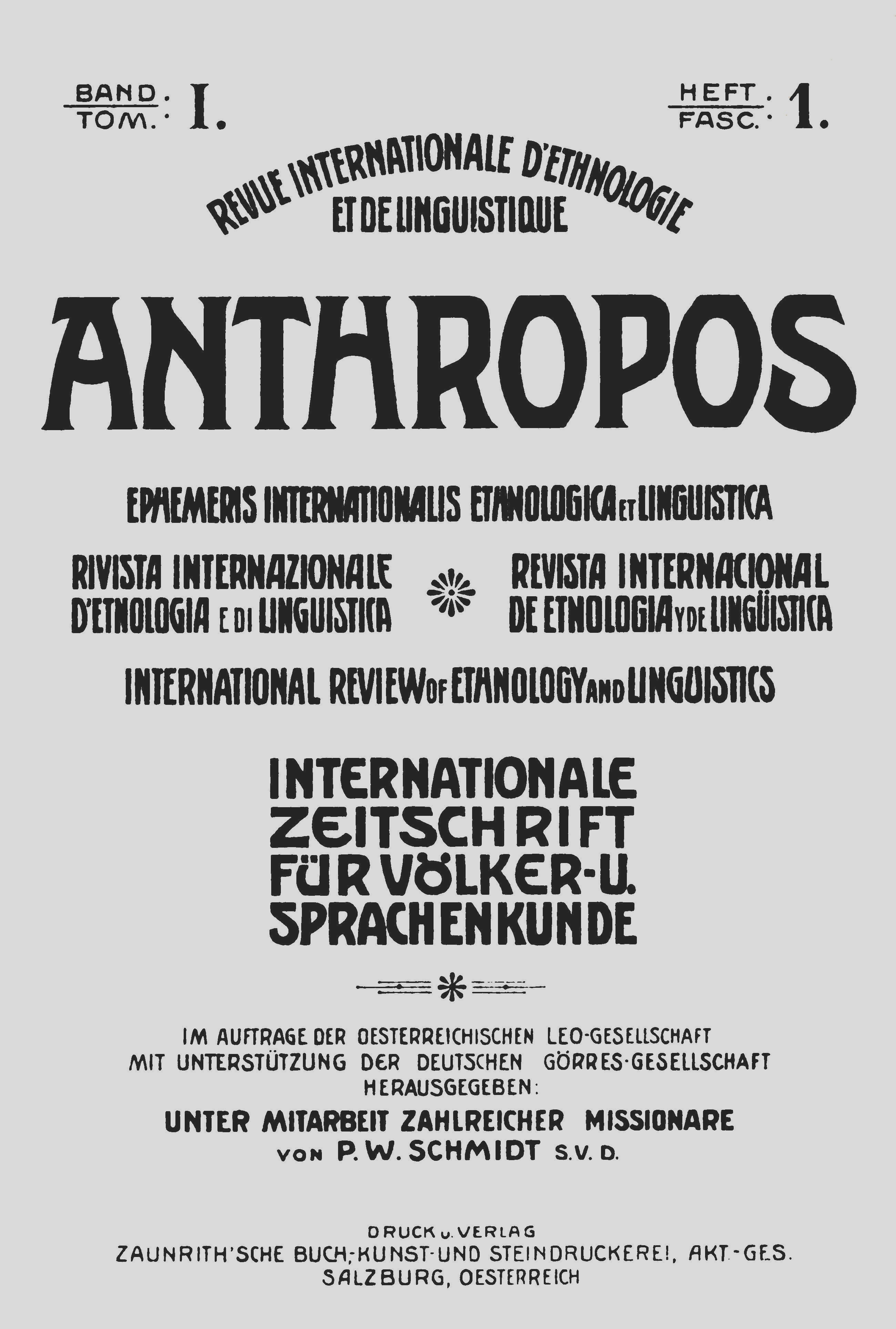
Anthropos (journal) – Title page of the first issue (1906)

Anthropos (journal)

Anthropos – Internationale Zeitschrift für Völker- und Sprachenkunde. Published by the Anthropos Institute, St. Augustin, since 1906, Anthropos is an internationally recognized journal of ethnology and linguistics, founded by Wilhelm Schmidt (SVD). It serves to publish research in ethnology, linguistics, and missionary studies. Initially, it was issued on behalf of the Austrian Leo Society, with support from the German Görres Society, and involved contributions from numerous missionaries under the direction of P. W. Schmidt (SVD). – Digitized issues

Anthropos-Bibliothek (monographische Reihe)

A monographic series in ethnology, linguistics, and religious studies published in connection with the journal Anthropos. – Subject of the main article.

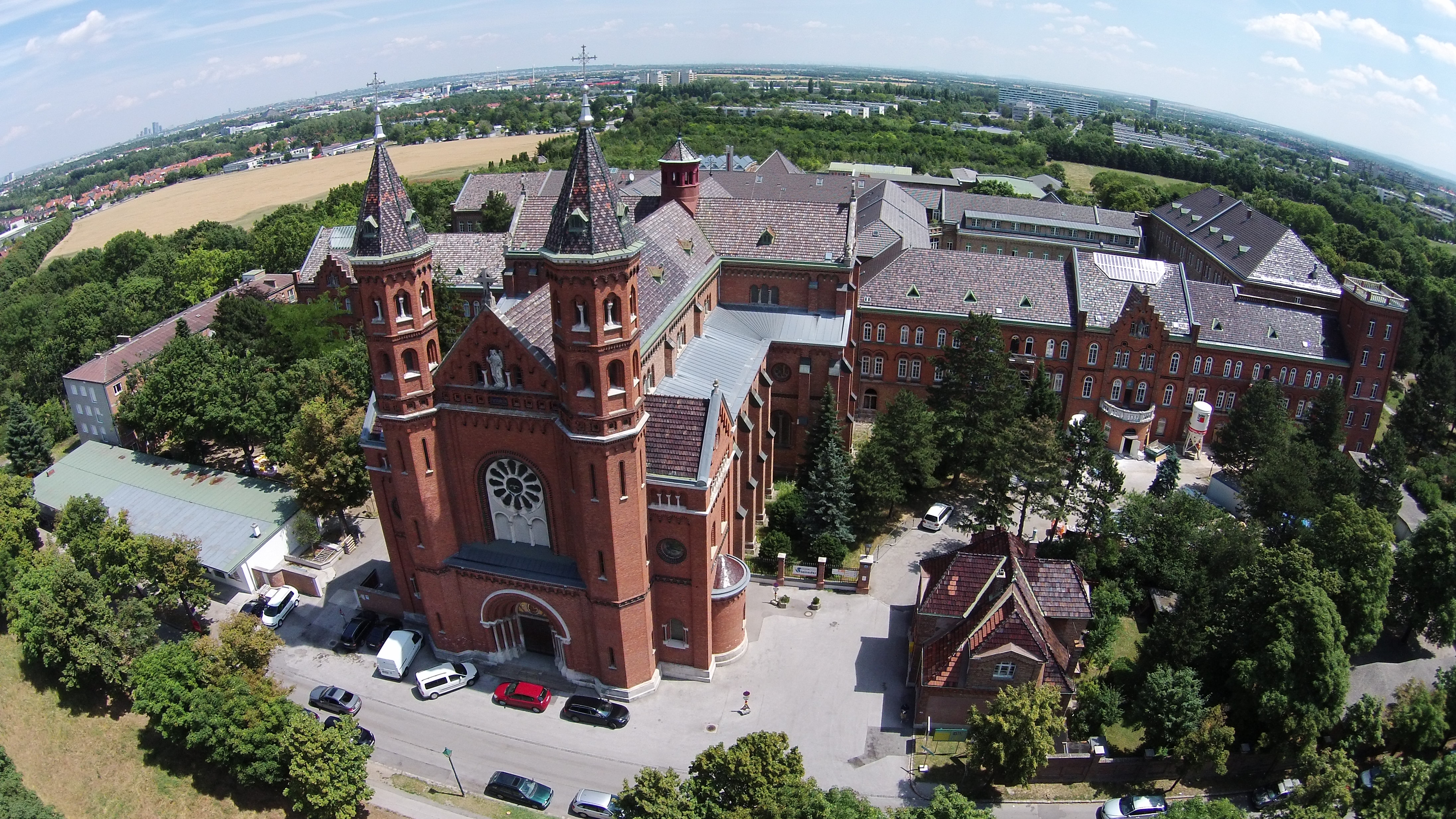
Mission house St. Gabriel

St. Gabriel (Missionshaus)

The Missionshaus St. Gabriel in Maria Enzersdorf (Mödling) near Vienna, an important center of the Divine Word Missionaries and one of the early institutional bases of the Anthropos enterprises.

Anthropos-Bibliothek. Mödling bei Wien (Bibliothek)

A scientific library maintained by the publishing house of Anthropos in Mödling, collecting and issuing ethnological works.

Anthropos-Bibliothek St. Augustin (Bibliothek)

After the relocation of Anthropos institutions to St. Augustin, an additional major ethnological library was established here as part of the Anthropos Institute.

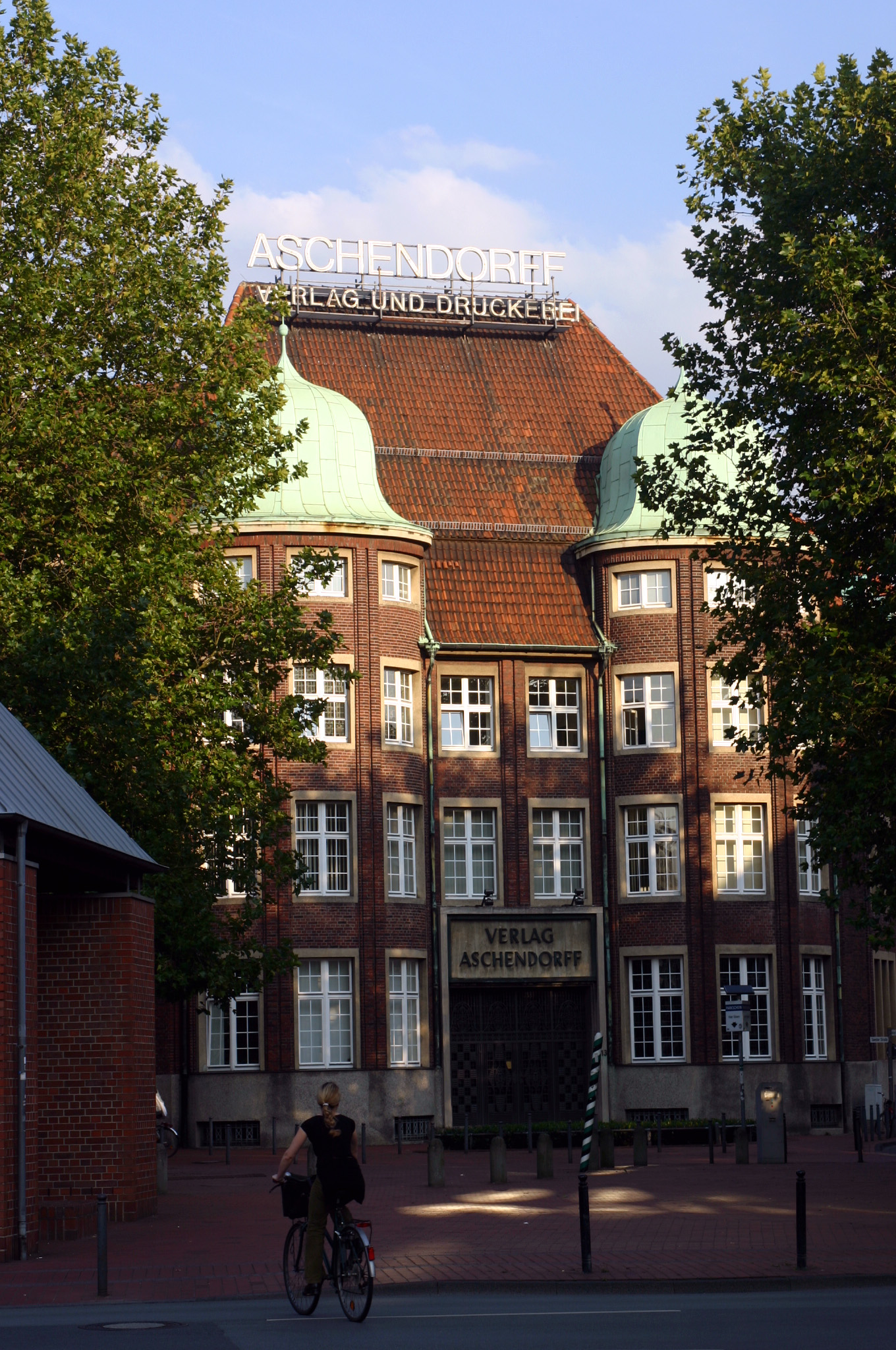
Aschendorff publishing house, headquarters until 2008

Aschendorffsche Buchhandlung (Münster i. Westf.)

The Aschendorff publishing house and bookshop in Münster i. Westf., the original publisher of many early Anthropos volumes.

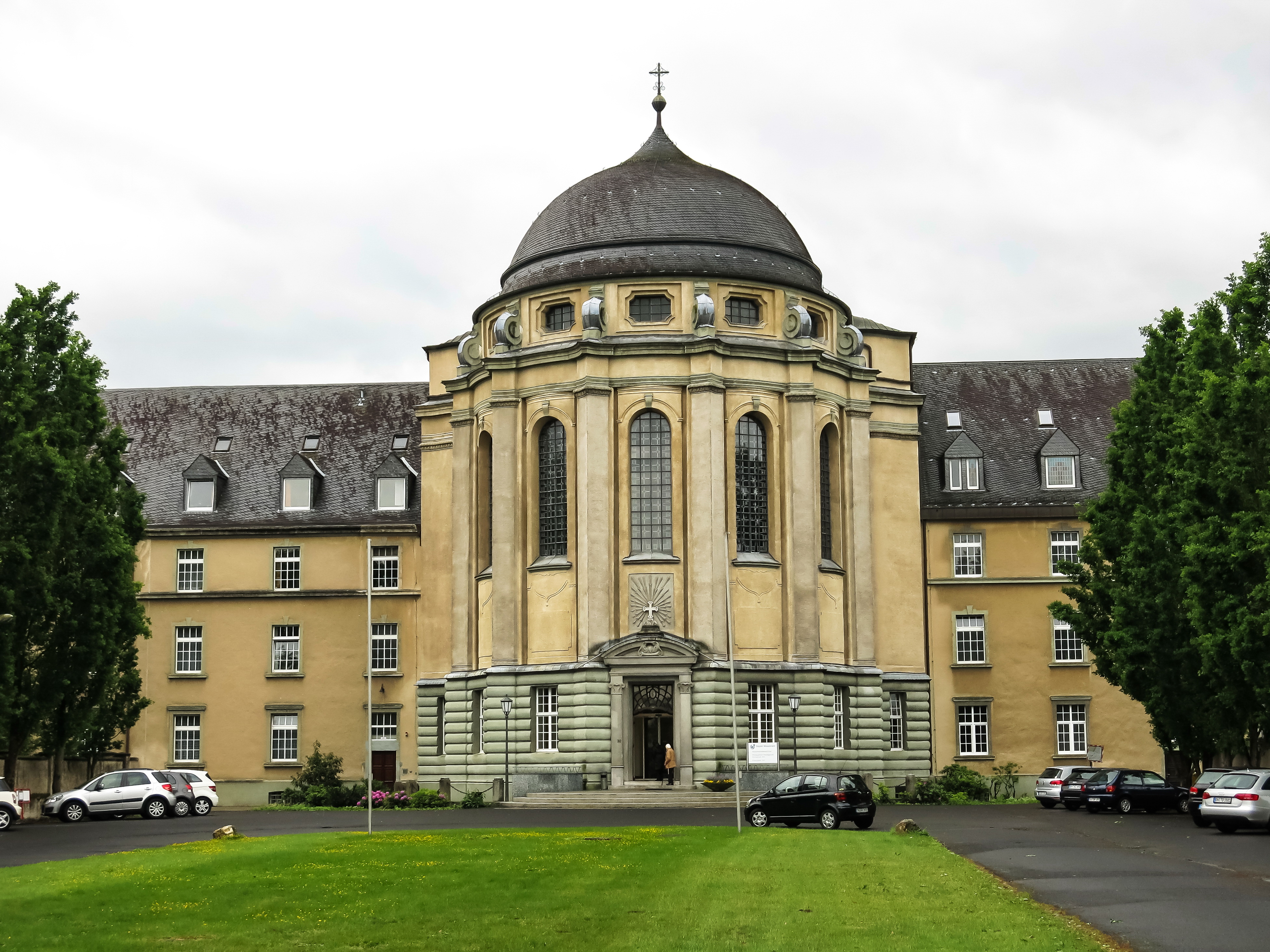
Mission house St. Augustin (2014)

Anthropos-Institut (Sankt Augustin)

Founded at the Missionshaus St. Augustin, serving as a research institute for ethnology and missionary studies. Since 1962 this has been the institutional home of the Anthropos journal and its associated collections.

Anthropos. St. Gabriel-Mödling

Refers to the Anthropos Institute originally founded in 1931 at St. Gabriel near Vienna, the early home of the journal Anthropos and its research library.

Anthropos-Institut im Château de Froideville, Posieux (Fribourg, Schweiz)

The Anthropos Institute located in Château de Froideville, Posieux (Fribourg), active from 1938 to 1962.

Anthropos. Wien
Mechitharisten-Buchdruckerei

A former printing location of the Anthropos journal, operated by the scholarly Mekhitarists printing house in Vienna.

Academia Verlag (Nomos)

The Academia Verlag took over the Anthropos journal in 2018; since then it has been an imprint of the Nomos Publishing Group.

Lehrstuhl und Institut für Ethnologie an der Universität Freiburg (Schweiz)

The chair and Institute of Ethnology at the University of Fribourg, established in 1942 by Wilhelm Schmidt (SVD), institutionally linked to the Anthropos Institute.

Vienna / Wien

See: St. Gabriel–Mödling; Mekhitarists Printing House.

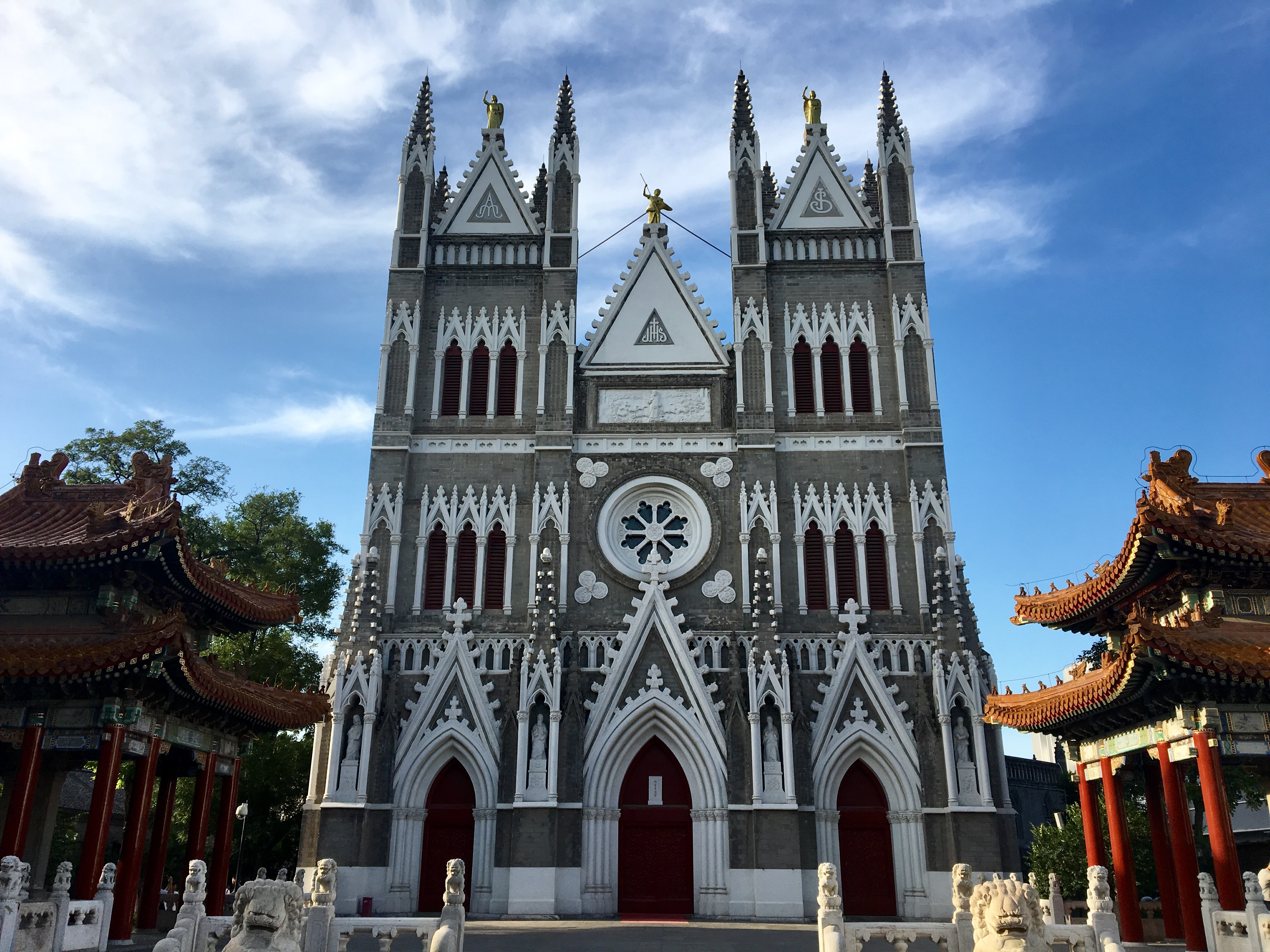
Church of the Saviour (Beitang) in Beijing

Drukkerij der Lazaristen (Pei-p'ing)

The Lazarist printing house in Beijing (French: Imprimerie des Lazaristes au Pé-T'ang), which printed various missionary publications; active also in producing early material related to the Anthropos network.

== Abbreviations ==
The following list of abbreviations primarily provides the order initials used on title pages and elsewhere (in the Anthropos publications, the individual letters of the initials are usually separated by periods, e.g., "SVD" = "S. V. D."):

- CICM = Congregatio Immaculati Cordis Mariae
- FSC = Fratres Scholarum Christianarum
- MSC = Missionarii Sacratissimi Cordis (French: Missionaires du Sacré-Cœur (de Jésus))
- OFM = Ordo Fratrum Minorum
- OMI = Oblati Mariae Immaculatae
- P. = Père / Pater
- R. P. = Révérend Père (Reverend Father), a form of address for Catholic priests or members of religious orders
- SJ = Societas Jesu (Jesuits)
- SVD = Societas Verbi Divini (Society of the Divine Word)

== See also ==
- Anthropos phonetic alphabet
