= Stephen Fuchs =

Austrian anthropologist (1908–2000)

- Born: April 30, 1908; Bruck an der Mur, Styria, Austria
- Died: January 17, 2000 (aged 91); St. Gabriel, Mödling, Austria
- Occupation: Anthropologist
- Known for: Research on the cultures of tribal and dalit peoples of India
- Board member of: ex–editorial board member of Asian Folklore Studies
- Awards: Cross of Honour for Science and Art, First Class

Academic background
- Education: Doctor of Philosophy; University of Vienna (Ph.D.)
- Influences: Wilhelm Schmidt

Academic work
- Discipline: Anthropology
- Sub-discipline: Ethnology; Ethnography
- Institutions: Founder and ex–director of Institute of Indian Culture, Mumbai
- Main interests: Ethnology and prehistory of India

Stephen Fuchs (April 30, 1908 – January 17, 2000) was an Austrian Catholic priest, missionary, and anthropologist who researched the ethnology and prehistory of India. After obtaining a Ph.D. in ethnology and Indology from the University of Vienna in 1950, Fuchs moved to India where he assisted in founding the Department of Anthropology at St. Xavier's College in Bombay. (Note: Bombay was officially renamed as Mumbai on 22 November 1995) After a brief imprisonment for being misidentified as a German missionary by the British government during World War II, Fuchs founded the Indian Branch of the Anthropos Institute, later renamed the Institute of Indian Culture. Fuchs, because of health concerns, moved to Austria in 1996 and died at the age of 91 in Mödling, Austria.

In his research, Fuchs conducted field studies in Central India. He focused particularly on the customs and beliefs of modern Indian tribes. Originally when he moved to India, he researched solely the social and cultural customs of modern-day central Indian tribes. After founding the Institute of Indian Culture, Fuchs researched the cultures of ancient India, back to India's original inhabitants.

== Early life and education ==
Fuchs was born on 30 April 1908 at Bruck an der Mur in Styria, Austria. Later, his family moved to Graz, where he studied at the advanced mission high school of the Society of the Divine Word (SVD) from 1922 to 1927. He joined the SVD's in 1927, and studied philosophy at St. Augustine in Bonn, Germany from 1927 to 1930, and theology at St. Gabriel in Mödling, Austria from 1930 to 1934. In Mödling, he took linguistics classes from Wilhelm Schmidt who taught ethnology and linguistics at the seminary of St. Gabriel. It was after coming in contact with Schmidt that he decided to become an anthropologist.

Later in 1934, he was ordained and appointed by the SVD's to one of its missions that was opened in 1932 in Indore, (in the modern Madhya Pradesh), in India. There, he learned English, Hindi, and the local dialects of Madhya Pradesh, before carrying out studies and fieldwork in central India. In 1947, the SVD General chapter decided that there should be an ethnologist in each of its mission areas, and consequently, he was commissioned by the SVD to study ethnology. He went back to Austria in 1948 and began studying at the University of Vienna for a Ph.D. in the fields of ethnology and Indology. He was able to complete his PhD in 1950, just two years, because of the large amount of field material he brought back from India to Austria and the articles he had already published on ethnography. For his Ph.D. dissertation, he studied the Bhumias' (Baiga tribe's branch) ritual of "horse sacrifice" and highlighted the relatedness between Aryans' Ashvamedha and their ritual of sacrificing a horse.

== Research ==
Along with being an anthropologist, Fuchs was a Catholic priest and missionary. Fuchs saw himself predominately as a scientist and a researcher. Bernd Pflug writes, "It is hard to say who was the more dominant in Fuchs—the missionary or the scholar? There is evidence for both, but looking at his anthropological research as a whole over more than six decades, it seems plausible to argue that the scholar in Fuchs had always the upper hand though this hand was tied to the task of mission." Fuchs believed that he could combine his "missionary work with scholarly contributions to early Indian civilisation". He spent several decades undertaking studies in India on the country's ethnology and prehistory. The tribal and "small-scale communities" of India were the primary focus of his research in central India. He did anthropological research on the "earliest inhabitants of India" to elucidate "the prehistory of the 'primitives or aborigines' and the early history of the 'high' cultures of India".

He was an editorial board member of the Asian Folklore Studies. He had a "deep fascination" for the cultures of the tribal and dalit peoples of India. Sebastian M. Michael, the director of the Institute of Indian Culture, writes: "...like Wilhelm Schmidt, he was convinced of the need to collect historical material about simple people throughout the world in order to understand humanity. His commitment developed into a veritable love affair with India and her rich tribal and dalit heritage." Wilhelm Schmidt had mentored Fuchs, however, Fuchs dissociated himself from Schmidt's culture circle theory (developed as part of the Vienna School of Ethnology (Note: A 20th century anthropology movement) in the early 1900s) which Pflug considers to be "rigid". According to Pflug, Fuchs "accepted a somewhat more flexible form of culture area theory". Josef Salmen viewed him as a cultural anthropologist.

=== Initial research ===
Fuchs initiated his studies by researching the Chamar caste's socio–cultural life, and wrote his first article in 1937 in Anthropos (journal) on the customs, marriage, and festivals of the Chamars. He researched central India's tribal communities, including the Korkus among who he stayed recurrently, learned the Korku language, and garnered data on their customs, festivals, and religious beliefs. He worked among the Balahis of Nimar for nearly a decade. He studied their culture, beliefs, and social organizations.

During the second world war, along with other missionaries from Germany, he was designated as an enemy alien by the British government in India and sent to a prison camp. His research work was halted for the duration of his imprisonment. He was later set free in 1945 after it came to light that he was an Austrian. During his confinement, he went back through the observations and notes that he had assembled on the beliefs and customs of Nimar's Balahis, and later in 1950 in Vienna, published a book titled The Children of Hari: A Study of the Nimar Balahis in the Central Provinces of India. After his release in 1945, he began studying the Gonds and Baigas, and resumed studies among the Korkus. Around this time, he developed interest in the Bhumias of Mandla district in Madhya Pradesh in whose villages he oftentimes stayed for long durations of time. In Madhya Pradesh, he carried out research on the Bhumias, Bhils, Bhilalas, Balahis, Gonds, Korkus, and sweeper castes; and in Uttar Pradesh, he conducted research on the Chamar people in the Varanasi and Ballia districts. Later, he studied in Austria between 1948 and 1950 for his doctorate degree.

=== Later research ===
After completing his PhD. in 1950 from Austria, Fuchs moved back to India and assisted in the establishment of the Department of Anthropology at Mumbai's St. Xavier's College, and worked as a lecturer in cultural anthropology at the college from 1950 to 1954. He later resigned to dedicate all of his time to conduct field research. In 1950, he established the Indian Branch of the Anthropos Institute at Mumbai as its founder and director. He delivered lectures on the cultures of ancient India at the University of Bombay (Note: The University of Bombay was officially renamed as the University of Mumbai on 4 September 1996.) and was a visiting scholar of anthropology and philosophy of India at the University of San Carlos in the Philippines between 1961 and 1962. The Anthropos Institute in Mumbai was renamed in 1976 as the "Institute of Indian Culture" and later gained recognition as a centre for postgraduate research in anthropology and sociology from the University of Mumbai.

Owen Lynch noted that Fuchs had researched India's politico–religious movements that had been narrated but not acknowledged as messianic, including the Satnampanth and Mahdi movements. Fuchs had studied 46 such movements and compiled those movements in his book Rebellious Prophets: A Study of Messianic Movements in Indian Religions (1965). Fuchs supported M. N. Srinivas's theory of Sanskritization by offering examples in the book. Fuchs had argued that the idea of a savior or messiah exists not only in the Biblical Christian thought, but it has persistently surfaced in the Indian religious movements and occurrences through historical and mythological persons of note, e.g. Vaishnavism.

Fuchs researched the ancient history of India, particularly the Aryans, Dravidians and India's autochthonous peoples, the aborigines who, according to him, represented India's earliest populace. His anthropological research on the earliest populace of India led him to cast light on the prehistory and early history of India's aborigines and "high" cultures, respectively. He was of the opinion that the Aryans were migrating to India and Europe from the inner Asian regions which had resulted in the genesis of the Indo-European language family. He believed that to ascertain the origination of the practice of untouchability, the Indologists must "penetrate deeply enough" in the history of the peoples who have had ascendancy in India.

== Written work ==
Fuchs' The Origin of Man and His Culture (1963) was reviewed by Harumi Befu of the University of Michigan who raised concerns over and questioned Fuchs' knowledge of paleontology, racial classification, and the advances in genetics. Befu further noted that Fuchs offered "only stages and no mechanism or process of evolution from one stage to another." Fuchs, however, drew some praise from R. K. Mutatkar for his unbiased approach towards the "discussion of the theory of anthropology" despite taking in the "Indian material"; though, Mutatkar noted that Fuchs attempted to offer "too much" information in a single book, and as a consequence, several key topics got inadequate coverage.

Fuchs' Rebellious Prophets: A Study of Messianic Movements in Indian Religions (1965) was assessed by Kenelm Burridge and Owen Lynch. Assessing the book, Burridge noted that Fuchs assembled "a wide range of much neglected material on Indian 'messianic' movements". Lynch stated that Fuchs did "a factual reporting of the data at hand". Indiana University's David Bidney reviewed Fuchs' coauthored book Essays in Ethnology (1969) that comprises 13 essays, all of which have "historical ethnology as developed by Fritz Graebner, Wilhelm Schmidt, Wilhelm Koppers and their followers" as the common subject matter. Assessing the essays, Bidney stated that though the authors were focused on the prehistory, they did not "clarify and resolve the basic issues" which their predecessors left for them. The Korkus of the Vindhya Hills (1988) was a volume having Fuchs' research on the "geographical environment and material culture", history, economy, and belief structure of the Korkus. University of Delhi's Sudha Gupta noted that Fuchs had done fieldwork among the tribal people of Vindhya hills region for over 20 years. Christoph von Fürer-Haimendorf viewed his research as a "meticulous analysis" of the subject matter.

=== The Children of Hari (1950) ===
Fuchs' The Children of Hari: A Study of the Nimar Balahis in the Central Provinces of India was a monographic anthropological–sociological study on the Balahi people, particularly, of the Nimar district of Madhya Pradesh.

Kathleen Gough noted that though Fuchs was affiliated with the Viennese school of anthropologists, he focused on the study material that was collected by his self-research and steered clear of the conjectural history theorized by the Vienna school. Assessing Fuchs' research, she stated that it "surpasses the standards of much Indian ethnography". John Henry Hutton noted that though the book was published under the patronage of the University of Vienna and was a part of the Wiener Beiträge zur Kulturgeschichte und Linguistik (Note: Viennese Contributions to Cultural History and Linguistics), it was free from the "theoretical bias which [had] come to be associated with the Vienna School". He saw the book as the "most detailed and painstakingly factual account" of the Balahis. W. Norman Brown stated that, for the most part, Fuchs's study largely focused on the culture of Balahis and noted that Fuchs' coverage of their racial, historical, and geographical background was "too brief". Kingsley Davis noted that he provided an "aptly illustrated" description of the "life-stages", "material culture", "social organizations", and magical and religious beliefs of the Balahis, but "without much theoretical interpretation". David G. Mandelbaum stated that the purpose of Fuchs' work was "primarily descriptive" and that he made few "historical and analytical" comments in the book. He stated that Fuchs illustrated the "fundamental principles of the classic caste system" in "rich detail", but also highlighted some areas of his work where Fuchs appeared unconvincing.

=== The Aboriginal Tribes of India (1973–74) ===
In The Aboriginal Tribes of India (Note: This book was originally composed in 1973. This book's 1st edition was published in 1973 and 1974. Its 2nd and 3rd editions were published in 1977 and 1992, respectively.), Fuchs examined different inward migrations to India including the arrival of Aryans. In the book, he presented research on India's "prehistoric races" of the early, middle and late Stone Age; the Indus Valley civilization; and the "post Harappan" era. He also researched the tribes from Bhutan, Nepal, Pakistan, Sikkim (Note: Sikkim became a part of the Republic of India on 16 May 1975) and also from India's Andaman and Nicobar Islands. His study included the tribes like the Baluchis, Brahuis, Kafirs, and Pathans. He also examined the contemporary tribes of Bengal; southern, central, northwestern, northern, northeastern, Himalayan and sub-Himalayan regions of India; and some tribes of Nepal. Along with the ethnic origins of the Indian subcontinent's aboriginal tribes, his research also focused on their language's general features, art, economy, political organization, religion, social structure. He also inquired into the contemporary changes affecting the life of tribal people.

Edward J. Jay of California State University, Hayward stated that the book was "encyclopedic" in nature and was based largely upon sources from 19th and early 20th century and cited very few recent studies. Giving an example of Fuchs' lack of archaeological analysis of a subject matter in his study of the middle Stone Age's races, Jay stated that a number of his conclusions were "conjectural" in nature. (Note: Assessed the edition of the book which was published at New York in the US in 1977 by St. Martin's Press. It was the 2nd edition of the book.) Soumendra Mohan Patnaik showed disappointment in the book's last chapter on the welfare of the tribal people in India. He stated that "in comparison to other chapters, the last one suffers from the problem of not containing the upto date statistical and census data. It also lacks the contemporary qualitative data on various development plans and programmes." (Note: Assessed the edition of the book which was published at New Delhi in India by Inter-India Publications as part of the Tribal Studies of India series. This was the 3rd and revised edition of the book, and it was published in 1992.) C. von Fürer-Haimendorf noted that Fuchs conducted a large amount of fieldwork in central India for his research on the subject. He stated that the parts of the book built on his field studies reflected "a greater depth of understanding" of the subject "than those based on literary sources". According to Gabriella Eichinger Ferro-Luzzi, Fuchs provided "convincing evidence" of the migrations of the "Dravida-speaking tribes" in the middle of the first millennium CE from India's southern regions to Odisha, Madhya Pradesh, and Bihar. She stated that Fuch's research was of significance for cross-cultural studies.

=== At the Bottom of Indian Society (1981) ===
Fuchs' At the Bottom of Indian Society: The Harijan and Other Low Castes was a companion volume of his previous book The Aboriginal Tribes of India, and it was an outcome of library research on India's all Harijans. Fuchs investigated the origin of untouchability and hypothesized that it has its origins in the migrations of Dravidians and Aryans to India. He gave a description of "Harijans and other low castes" in the light of his findings. Fuchs propounded that, "...untouchability is probably an ancient social trait from animal breeding culture which was brought to India by the Aryans and also the Dravidians." Fuchs did not view "ritual purity and impurity" as the underlying principles for the social condition of the untouchables and imposition of untouchability on them as suggested by Louis Dumont, rather he suggested that they were artisans and laborers in the "highly-developed complex farming culture" they had, but their social stature got disparaged due to their pecuniary dependence on the cultivators who maintained a higher social standing.

Reviewing Fuchs' research, G. E. Ferro-Luzzi noted the Fuchs examined "all the numerous criteria for lowness" and instability of the Harijans and the people from other lower castes in the Indian social stratum. Yoshio Sugimoto questioned Fuchs' categorization of various tribes, castes, communities, and social classes under the umbrella terms like "Untouchables", "Harijan castes", and "Harijan and other low castes". Sugimoto wrote, "we are therefore in the dark as to which term he uses to refer to the category in general."

== Move to Austria and death ==
Fuchs was a cultural anthropologist who excelled at field work and note taking. He is celebrated and honoured for his recording of the cultures of the peoples where he resided. He had an acute ear for language and history. He formed his own method of anthropology and stayed away from the academic assumptions and cultural theories of the Vienna School. He was both praised and criticised for the depth and simplicity of his work. He set strong boundaries for his works, which, to other anthropologists were richly rewarding yet frustrating.

Fuchs moved to Austria in 1996 due to concerns related to health. On 26 March 1998, Fuchs was awarded the Cross of Honour for Science and Art, First Class by the government of Austria. He was awarded the Golden Doctor Diploma on 14 November 1999 specifically "in recognition of his contribution to the field of Indian Anthropology". The document additionally stated that he "gained the highest merits for the ethnology of India". He died at the age of 91 years on 17 January 2000 at St. Gabriel, Mödling in Austria, and his body is buried at the graveyard of the seminary where the body of Wilhelm Schmidt is buried.

== Works ==
Fuchs wrote 22 books, nearly 150 articles, and many monographs.

=== Books ===
- Fuchs, Stephen (1996). The Vedic Horse Sacrifice: In Its Culture–historical Relations. New Delhi: Inter-India. LCCN 96901614.
- Fuchs, Stephen (1990). Kämpchen, Martin (ed.). Das Leben ist ein Tanz. Lieder der Indischen Ureinwohner. Ausgewählt, aus den Stammessprachen Übersetzt und Eingeleitet von Stefan Fuchs [Life is a Dance. Songs of the Native Indian People. Selected, Translated from the Tribal Languages and Introduced by Stefan Fuchs] (in German). Zurich: Benziger Verlag.
- Fuchs, Stephen (1974) [1973]. The Aboriginal Tribes of India. New Delhi: Macmillan. LCCN 74902196.
- Fuchs, Stephen (1960). The Gond and Bhumia of Eastern Mandla. London: Asia Publishing House. LCCN 60004492.
- Fuchs, Stephen (1957). Social Origins. Mumbai: Gyanayatan. OCLC 717104031.
- Fuchs, Stephen (1945). The Great Synthesis. Light of the East. Vol. 32 (2nd ed.). Ranchi: Catholic Press. OCLC 41629014.

=== Selected papers ===
- Fuchs, Stephen (1964). "Magic Healing Techniques among the Balahis in Central India". Magic, Faith and Healing: Studies in Primitive Psychiatry Today.
- Fuchs, Stephen (May–August 1952). "Another Version of the Baiga Creation Myth". Anthropos. 47 (3/4). Nomos Verlagsgesellschaft mbH: 607–619. JSTOR 40449679.
- Fuchs, Stephen (1965). "Messianic Movements in Primitive India". Asian Folklore Studies. 24 (1). Nagoya, Japan: Anthropological Institute, Nanzan University: 11–62. doi:10.2307/1177596. JSTOR 1177596.
- Fuchs, Stephen (1972). Land Scarcity and Land Hunger among Some Aboriginal Tribes of Western Central India.
- Fuchs, Stephen (1966). "Messianic Movements in Tribal India". Journal of the Anthropological Society of Bombay. 12 (1): 15–33.
- Fuchs, Stephen (1942). "The Marriage Rites of the Bhils in the Nimar District". Man in India. 22. OCLC 33288488.

== See also ==
- Mikhail Konstantinovich Kudryavtsev
- Paul Hockings
