= Roman School =

Roman School may refer to:

- School in ancient Rome, see Education in Ancient Rome
- The Roman School (music), a musical style established by Palestrina (1525 or 1526-1594) and his followers
- Scuola Romana (Roman School) or Scuola di via Cavour, a 20th-century art movement
- Roman School (history of religion), a methodological approach to the history of religion that was prominent in mid-20th century Italy
