= Erik Haarh =

Erik Haarh (? - December 1, 1993) was a 20th-century Danish Tibetologist, most remembered for his pioneering work on the religious ethos of the Tibetan Empire and his contributions to the study of the Zhang Zhung language.

== Education ==
Haarh graduated from college in 1948; throughout his education he had a strong interest and passion for the Tibetan Language and culture. Much of the special literature in this area was unavailable in Denmark, so he made contacts in London and had the necessary material imported.

After graduating he began to study the history of religion and aimed to write a dissertation about Buddhism, which required extensive language study. Following up on his interest for Tibetan language and culture, he went to Rome where he met Giuseppe Tucci and other professors such as Raffaele Pettazzoni and Walter Simon. As a part of this stay in Rome he took courses using sources in Sanskrit, Hindi, Pali, Tibetan and Chinese.

After finishing his MA degree in 1955 he was employed by Copenhagen University as a teaching assistant in Tibetan language and culture. In 1956 he was employed as a librarian at the Royal Danish Library in their Oriental Department, and in 1962 became the head of the department. During the years that followed he made many research journeys in Europe and was a guest speaker at many different universities.

== Career ==
Starting in 1969 he became head of the History/Religion Department at Aarhus University. In the same year, he finished his work on his magnum opus The Yarlun dynasty. In this dissertation he put his focus on showing how the ideology of the King as a main pillar in the society is connected to the religious cosmology and used sources such as priests and other hierarchical institutions. The final result has been considered quite a contribution to the Tibetology study in general.

After this he worked on several catalogues – e.g. a comparative list of the Derge and Lhasa editions of the Kanjur and a catalogue of oriental manuscripts and xylographs owned in Denmark and was therefore considered a highly valued specialist in that area.

He worked with some of his students of religion as the main contributors to a series of study materials used for colleges and A-levels and took the initiative in arranging some lectures and conferences – these being published in the same series of study material.

He was invited to give lectures and instructions when UNESCO initiated a school project offering material on foreign religions for primary school teachers. These efforts created an image of him as a very approachable and friendly man who like the joined efforts of the work and who didn’t just spend his time in his office behind a pile of books.

Beginning in 1983 Haarh became a professor in the Faculty of Theology. He died on 1 December 1993, after being ill for a long time.

== Selected works ==
- The zhang-zhung language : a grammar and dictionary of the unexplored language of the Tibetan Bonpos. Universitetsforlaget i Aarhus og Munksgaard, 1968
- The Yar-lun dynasty: A study with particular regard to the contribution by myths and legends to the history of ancient Tibet and the origin and nature of its kings. G.E.C. Gad's forlag, 1969, Koebenhavn.
