= Turned P =

Letter of the Latin alphabet

- P p

Usage
- Type: alphabetic
- Language of origin: Siouan languages, Anthropos phonetic alphabet
- Sound values: [pː], [ʰp]

History
- Development: P p: P p
- Time period: 19th century, 1907 onwards

Other
- Writing direction: left-to-right

Turned P (P p) is an additional letter of the Latin script which was used in the orthographies of certain Siouan languages, mostly by James Owen Dorsey in the 19th century. Its lowercase form is used in the Anthropos alphabet, the phonetic alphabet of the journal Anthropos.

This letter has the form of a P and p turned 180 degrees.

== Usage ==
Dorsey used turned P P p in his published works to represent [pː], a tense consonant present in three Dhegihan languages: Omaha-Ponca, Quapaw, and Kansa. It is also used for Osage, but this is erroneous as the sound [pː] does not occur, but a preaspirated [ʰp] consonant corresponds.

In the Anthropos phonetic alphabet, p is used to represent bilabial clicks.

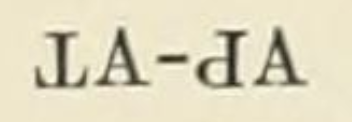
Turned P, in Dorsey 1884.

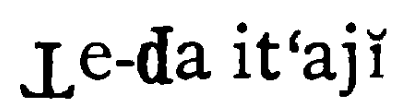
Turned P, in Dorsey 1891.

== Bibliography ==
- Dorsey, James Owen (1884). "Omaha Sociology". Third Annual Report of the Bureau of American Ethnology to the Secretary of the Smithsonian Institution 1881-'82: 211–370., copie sur omahatribe.unl.edu.
- Dorsey, James Owen (1888). "Osage Traditions". Sixth Annual Report of the Bureau of American Ethnology to the Secretary of the Smithsonian Institution 1884-'85: 377–408..
- Dorsey, James Owen (1897). "Siouan Sociology: A Posthumous Paper". Fifteenth Annual Report of the Bureau of Ethnology to the Secretary of the Smithsonian Institution 1893-'94: 269–294. (www.unl.edu).
- Everson, Michael; Dicklberger, Alois; Pentzlin, Karl; Wandl-Vogt, Eveline (2011). Revised proposal to encode "Teuthonista" phonetic characters in the UCS (PDF).

== See also ==
- Latin script
- P
- Komi De, a homoglyph of this letter
