= Krankheitsprojektile. Untersuchung über eine urtümliche Krankheitserklärung =

1959 ethnomedicine book

Cover of the book.

Krankheitsprojektile: Untersuchung über eine urtümliche Krankheitserklärung ('Disease Projectiles: A Study of the Primitive Explanation of Disease'), by Lauri Honko, is a 258-page German-language book published as number 178 in the series Folklore Fellows’ Communications (Helsinki: Suomalainen Tiedeaktemia, 1959). The work originated as Honko's pro gradu (master's) thesis, originally composed in Finnish.

== Summary ==
The work is fundamentally a study in ethnomedicine, focusing specifically on the globally widespread conception of some illnesses as a metaphysical projectile penetrating the body. As a German-language term in the history of medicine, the word Projektil was coined by Honko, and its meaning does not correspond precisely to English projectile: 'intrusive object' would be a more accurate English rendering. Honko finds that the projectile-explanation for illness is associated with "diseases which start suddenly and severely and in which the pains are frequently localized in a definite part of the body".

The book begins with a general discussion of metaphysical explanations for illness, including (on pp. 23–37) breach of taboo, loss of the soul, possession, intrusive objects, and worms. Honko proceeds to a survey of evidence for the projectile idea in cultures across the globe (pp. 41–82), analysing the relationship that this idea has to the other conceptions of illness. This survey makes extensive use of Forrest E. Clements's Primitive Concepts of Disease. Honko argues that the projectile explanation for diseases was displaced from Egypt, Asia Minor and India by explanations based on spirit intrusion (possession); that soul-loss gained priority as an explanation in North and Central Asia; and that taboo-violation became dominant among the Polynesians, Incas, Aztecs and the Baffinland-Eskimos (pp. 75–77).

The second part of the book (pp. 83–190) focuses on the projectile phenomenon in Finland, demonstrating that Finnish projectile ideas have parallels in the neighboring cultures. Honko argues that although the terminology used in his sources was Finnic (Finnish ammus 'shot' and lento 'flight' alongside Estonian lendav 'flight'), these terms were loan-translations from early Germanic languages, arguing that the projectile-explanation originated in Germanic-language cultures (pp. 83, 112–17, 201).

Honko's source-base includes accounts of people who personally remembered the projectile idea as an explanation for epidemic diseases, legends, folklorists' descriptions of cures, and magical formulas collected from oral tradition. Honko identified three groups of afflictions for which the projectile idea was a key explanation. It was the dominant explanation of Schußkrankheit ('shot-illness') among livestock (pp. 83–118)—an affliction which may have included anthrax, and for which verbal charms were not deployed. Projectile motifs were found among traditional aetiologies of Stichkrankheit ('sting-illness') in humans (pp. 119–50); ailments in this category may have corresponded, inter alia, to "muscular strains, rheumatic pains, respiratory and heart inflammations". Honko found that the projectile idea was rarer for plague, whether among humans or animals, but that it was found in eastern Finland, while the rest of Finland deployed ideas of the wandernden Pestwesen as the causative agent of the diseases.

At the end of the study, Honko embarks on an attempt to map the motifs prevalent in healing practices, extending that concept beyond its traditional use in assessing narratives. He concludes (p. 209) that

die Projektilerklärung ist der ideologische Inhalt des traditionellen Heilungsaktes innerhalb einer Kultur (traditionsgeschichtlicher Aspekt), sie wirkt als psychotherapeutisches Veranschaulichungsmittel (individualpsychologischer Aspekt), sie leitet das Verhalten des Heilkundigen und ermöglicht seine Tätigkeit zur Pflege des Patienten und zur Wiederherstellung der konventionellen Lebensordnung der Gemeinschaft (sozialpsychologischer Aspekt). Dieselbe Funktion haben auch die übrigen Kfankheitserklärungen.

The projectile explanation is the ideological content of the traditional healing act within a culture (traditional-historical aspect); it acts as a psychotherapeutic means of illustration (individual-psychological aspect); it guides the behaviour of the healer and enables his activity to care for the patient and to restore the conventional way of life in the community (social-psychological aspect). The other explanations of illness have the same function.

== Criticisms ==
Honko's archival research into Finnic-language traditions was widely praised. However, Elli Kaija Köngäs found that in his overview of global traditions, Honko was heavily reliant on religious scriptures and too inclined to take literary metaphor for ethnomedical tradition. Paul Leser and Jaan Puhvel likewise found Honko's attempt at a global overview too patchy and poorly informed.

== Influence ==
The structure of the work has been particularly noted as a model for Anna-Leena Siikala's 1978 doctoral dissertation The Rite-Technique of the Siberian Shaman.
