= Anthropos (journal) =

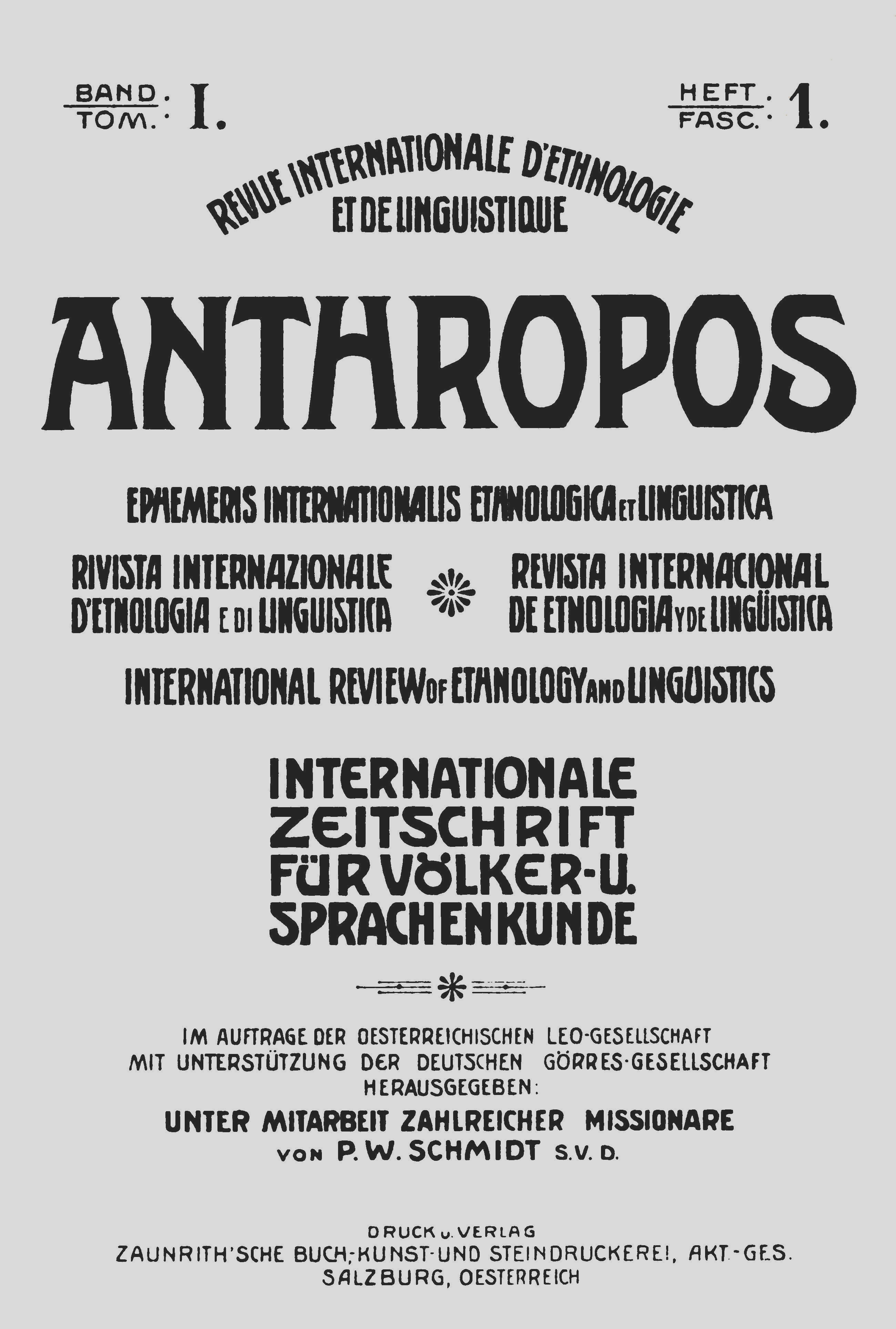
- Title page of the first issue (1906)
- Discipline: Anthropology, ethnology, linguistics
- Language: Dutch, English, French, German, Italian, Latin, Polish, Portuguese, Spanish
- Edited by: Darius J. Piwowarczyk

Publication details
- History: 1906-present
- Publisher: Nomos Verlagsgesellschaft on behalf of the Anthropos Institute (Germany)
- Frequency: Biannual

Standard abbreviations
- ISO 4: Anthropos

Indexing
- ISSN: 0257-9774
- LCCN: 07021775
- JSTOR: 02579774
- OCLC no.: 1481573

Links
- Journal homepage; Online access; Online archive

Anthropos is a biannual multilingual peer-reviewed academic journal covering anthropology, ethnology, and linguistics research. It was established in 1906 by Wilhelm Schmidt.

Originally intended to publish research by Catholic missionaries, the journal quickly became one of the most influential publications in the fields of ethnology and anthropology, while maintaining its religious study origins. In 1931 Schmidt, Martin Gusinde, Paul Schebesta, and Wilhelm Koppers founded the Anthropos Institute, which became the journal's publisher.

== History ==
When Schmidt got the first issue of Anthropos out in February 1906 (then at Missionshaus St. Gabriel near Vienna in Austria), it was praised not only by the religious scholars, but also by such an anti-clerical figure as the French ethnographer Arnold van Gennep. Van Gennep confirmed his initial opinion a year later, stating that the four issues printed so far "place this journal among the ethnographic publications of the first rank".

The initial name of the publication was Anthropos - Internationale Zeitschrift für Völker- und Sprachenkunde ("International Review of Ethnology and Linguistcs"), as suggested by Paul Huber (then owner of Kösel-Verlag) and Karl Muth; Schmidt himself considered Latin names like Omnes Gentes ("All Peoples").

The first issue contained (on 163 pages) articles in German, English, French, Spanish, Italian, Latin; more languages were added later. However, in the beginning of the 21st century English predominates.

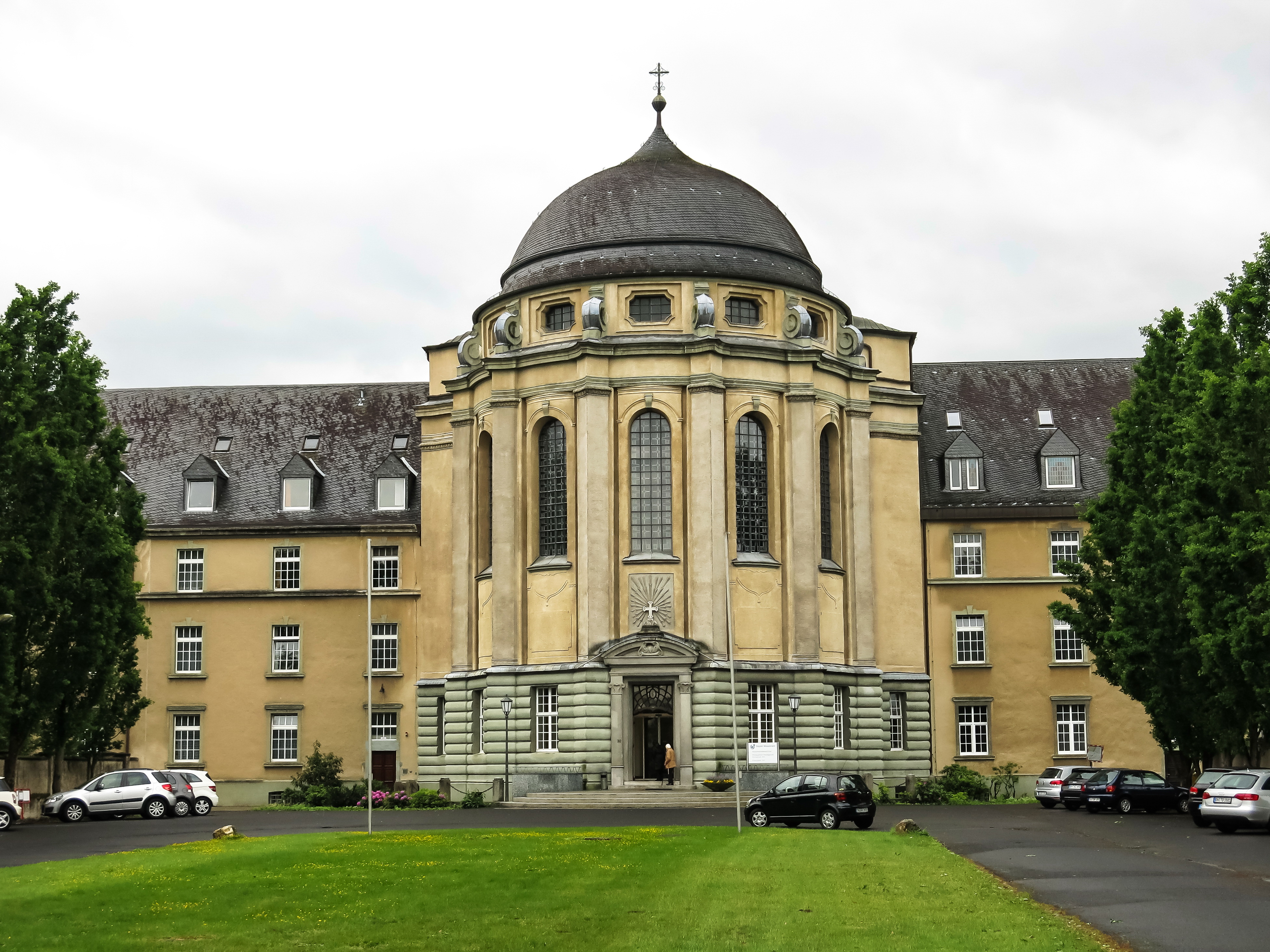
Missionshaus St. Augustin, the current location of the Anthropos Institute

Schmidt always wanted to have an institution behind the journal. It took him 25 years to create the Anthropos Institute, but the interbellum conditions limited the possibilities, so a regular editorial structure was only put into place in 1962, when Anthropos moved to Missionshaus St. Augustin in Germany. In the meantime, after the Anschluss in 1938, Anthropos was operating out of Posieux in Switzerland (for more than 60 years the printing continued to be done in Swiss Fribourg, even after the move of editorial staff to Germany).

== See also ==
- Anthropos-Bibliothek
- Anthropos phonetic alphabet

== Sources ==
- Quack, Anton (2006). "100 Years of "Anthropos"". Anthropos. 101 (1). Nomos Verlagsgesellschaft mbH: 3–7. JSTOR 40466616.
- Piwowarczyk, Darius J. (2021). "Anthropos ‒ A Journal that Introduced a Missionary Order into the Curious World of Academia". Giants’ Footprints. Academia – ein Verlag in der Nomos Verlagsgesellschaft. pp. 81–118. doi:10.5771/9783985720156-81.
- Fisher, D.; Price, S.; Hanstock, T. (2018). Information Sources in the Social Sciences. Guides to Information Sources. De Gruyter. p. 1065. ISBN 978-3-11-094932-2.
- Brandewie, Ernest (1990). When Giants Walked the Earth: The Life and Times of Wilhelm Schmidt, SVD. University Press. ISBN 978-3-7278-0712-1.
