= Josef Meier =

German missionary and ethnologist

Josef Meier (also P. Jos. Meier, Paul Jos. Meier, Joseph Meier, Paul Joseph Meier, Paul Josef Meier) (7 November 1874 – 28 November 1945) was a missionary and ethnologist. He was a member of the Roman Catholic Missionaries of the Sacred Heart order. He worked in the Bismarck Archipelago with the peoples of the Gazelle Peninsula on New Britain Island in Papua New Guinea.

== Life ==
Meier recorded myths and stories of the peoples of the Gazelle peninsula in the local Tolai language, and then translated them into German. In this work Meier employed an early version of the interlinear gloss. His work describing the myths and legends of the Admiralty Islanders of the Bismarck Archipelago was one of the earliest collections describing the mythology of a Melanesian tribe.

== Bibliography ==
- Mythen und Erzählungen der Küstenbewohner der Gazelle-Halbinsel (Neu-Pommern). Im Urtext aufgezeichnet und ins Deutsche übertragen v. P.J. Meier. Aschendorffsche Buchhandlung, Münster 1909 (Anthropos-Bibliothek, Bd. 1).
- Primitive Völker und „Paradies“-Zustand. Mit besonderer Berücksichtigung der früheren Verhältnisse beim Oststamm der Gazellenhalbinsel im Bismarck-Archipel (Neu-Pommern). In: Anthropos. Band 2, 1907, S. 374–386
- Mythen und Sagen der Admiralitätsinsulaner. In: Anthropos. Band 2, 1907, S. 646–667 und 933–941; Band 3, 1908, S. 193–206 und 651–671; sowie Band 4, 1909, S. 354–374
- Steinbilder des Iniet-Geheimbundes bei den Eingeborenen des nordöstlichen Teils der Gazellehalbinsel, Neupommern, Südsee. Anthropos 6, 1911: 837-867.
- Feier der Sonnenwende auf der Insel Vuatam, Bismarckarchipel, Südsee. Anthropos, 7(3), 1912: 706-721.
- Zur Benennung der Sprache der Nordgazellen-Halbinsel, Neupommern, Südsee. Anthropos 8(6), 1913: 1142.
- Illegitimate birth among the Gunantuna. Washington, D.C., Catholic anthropological conference, 1938.
- The orphan child among the Gunantuna. In: Publications of the Catholic Anthropological Conference, Vol. 2, No. 2, S. 63-128 (1939).
- Notes on Animism in the Bismarck Archipelago. In: Primitive Man, Vol. 15, No. 3/4, S. 66-70. Jul. - Oct., 1942
- Reminiscences. A Memoir. In: Chronicle, special issue, 1945.
