= P =

Sixteenth letter of the Latin alphabet

- P p

Usage
- Writing system: Latin script
- Type: Alphabetic and logographic
- Language of origin: Latin language
- Sound values: [p] [pʰ] [(p)f] [pʼ] [b]
- In Unicode: U+0050, U+0070
- Alphabetical position: 16

History
Development
D21
              - 𐌐
                - P p
- Time period: c. 700 BCE to present
- Descendants: • Ᵽ • ₱ • ℘ • ⅌ • ℗ • ♇ • ꟼ • ¶
- Sisters: Π π Ⲡ П ף פ פּ ف ܦ ࠐ 𐎔 በ ጰ ፐ Պ պ प 𐍀 པ

Other
- Associated graphs: p(x), ph
- Writing direction: Left-to-right

P (minuscule: p) is the sixteenth letter of the Latin alphabet, used in the modern English alphabet, the alphabets of other western European languages and others worldwide. Its name in English is pee (pronounced /ˈpiː/), plural pees.

== History ==
The Semitic Pê (mouth), as well as the Greek Π or π (Pi), and the Etruscan and Latin letters that developed from the former alphabet all symbolized /p/, a voiceless bilabial plosive.

| Egyptian | Proto-Sinaitic | Proto-Canaanite pʿit | Phoenician Pe | Western Greek Pi | Etruscan P | Latin P |
|---|---|---|---|---|---|---|
| D21 | | | | | | Latin P |

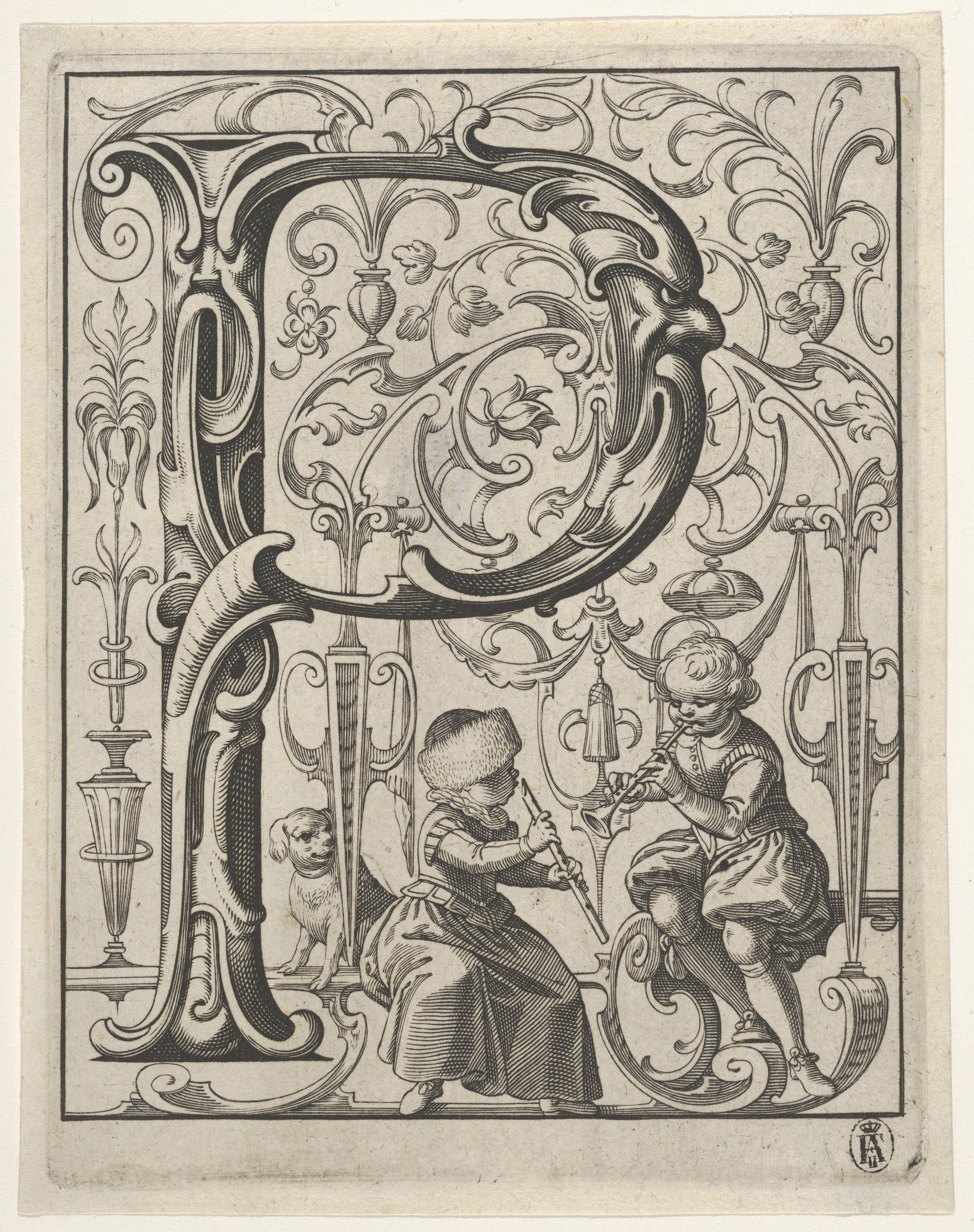
Late Renaissance or early Baroque design of a P, from 1627

== Use in writing systems ==
Pronunciation of ⟨p⟩ by language
| Orthography | Phonemes |
|---|---|
| Catalan | /p/ |
| Standard Chinese (Pinyin) | /pʰ/ |
| English | /p/, silent |
| French | /p/, silent |
| German | /p/ |
| Portuguese | /p/ |
| Spanish | /p/ |
| Turkish | /p/ |

=== English ===
In English orthography, ⟨p⟩ represents the sound /p/.

A common digraph in English is ⟨ph⟩, which represents the sound /f/, and can be used to transliterate ⟨φ⟩ phi in loanwords from Greek. In German, the digraph ⟨pf⟩ is common, representing a labial affricate /pf/.

Most English words beginning with ⟨p⟩ are of foreign origin, primarily French, Latin and Greek; these languages preserve the Proto-Indo-European initial *p. Native English cognates of such words often start with ⟨f⟩, since English is a Germanic language and thus has undergone Grimm's law; a native English word with an initial /p/ would reflect Proto-Indo-European initial *b, which is so rare that its existence as a phoneme is disputed. However, native English words with non-initial ⟨p⟩ are quite common; such words can come from either Kluge's law or the consonant cluster /sp/ (PIE: *p has been preserved after s).

P is the eighth least frequently used letter in the English language.

=== Other languages ===
In most European languages, ⟨p⟩ represents the sound /p/.

=== Other systems ===
In the International Phonetic Alphabet, ⟨p⟩ is used to represent the voiceless bilabial plosive.

== Other uses ==
- A bold italic letter p is used in musical notation as a dynamic indicator for "quiet". It stands for the Italian word piano.

== Related characters ==
=== Ancestors, descendants and siblings ===
The Latin letter P represents the same sound as the Greek letter Pi, but it looks like the Greek letter Rho.

- 𐤐 : Semitic letter Pe, from which the following symbols originally derive:
  - Π π : Greek letter Pi
    - 𐌐 : Old Italic and Old Latin P, which derives from Greek Pi, and is the ancestor of modern Latin P. The Roman P had this form (𐌐) on coins and inscriptions until the reign of Claudius, c. 50 AD.
    - 𐍀 : Gothic letter pertra/pairþa, which derives from Greek Pi
    - П п : Cyrillic letter Pe, which derives from Greek Pi
  - Ⲡ ⲡ : Coptic letter Pi
  - Պ պ: Armenian letter Pe
- P with diacritics: Ṕ ṕ Ṗ ṗ Ᵽ ᵽ Ƥ ƥ ᵱ ᶈ
- Turned P: P d, an additional letter of the Latin script not encoded in Unicode
- Uralic Phonetic Alphabet-specific symbols related to P:
  - U+1D18 ᴘ LATIN LETTER SMALL CAPITAL P
  - U+1D3E ᴾ MODIFIER LETTER CAPITAL P
  - U+1D56 ᵖ MODIFIER LETTER SMALL P
  - U+209A ₚ LATIN SUBSCRIPT SMALL LETTER P was used in the Uralic Phonetic Alphabet prior to its formal standardization in 1902

=== Derived ligatures, abbreviations, signs and symbols ===
- ₱ : Philippine peso sign
- 𝒫, 𝓅 : script letter P (uppercase and lowercase, respectively), used in mathematics. (In other contexts, a script typeface (or computer font) should be used.)
- ℘ Weierstrass p
- ℗ : sound recording copyright symbol
- ♇ : Pluto symbol, a monogram of the letters "PL", and also the initials of Percival Lowell, heralding his role in its discovery
- ꟼ : Reversed P was used in ancient Roman texts to stand for puella (girl)
- Ꝑ ꝑ, Ꝓ ꝓ, Ꝕ, ꝕ : Various forms of P were used for medieval scribal abbreviations

== Other representations ==
=== Computing ===
- U+0050 P LATIN CAPITAL LETTER P
- U+0070 p LATIN SMALL LETTER P
- U+FF30 Ｐ FULLWIDTH LATIN CAPITAL LETTER P
- U+FF50 ｐ FULLWIDTH LATIN SMALL LETTER P

=== Other ===
| NATO phonetic | Morse code |
| Papa | ▄ ▄▄▄ ▄▄▄ ▄ |

Signal flag

Flag semaphore
American manual alphabet (ASL fingerspelling)
British manual alphabet (BSL fingerspelling)
Unified English Braille

== See also ==
- Mind your Ps and Qs
- Pence or "penny", the English slang for which is p (e.g. "20p" = 20 pence)
