= Lauri Honko =

Finnish professor of folklore studies and comparative religion (1932-2002)

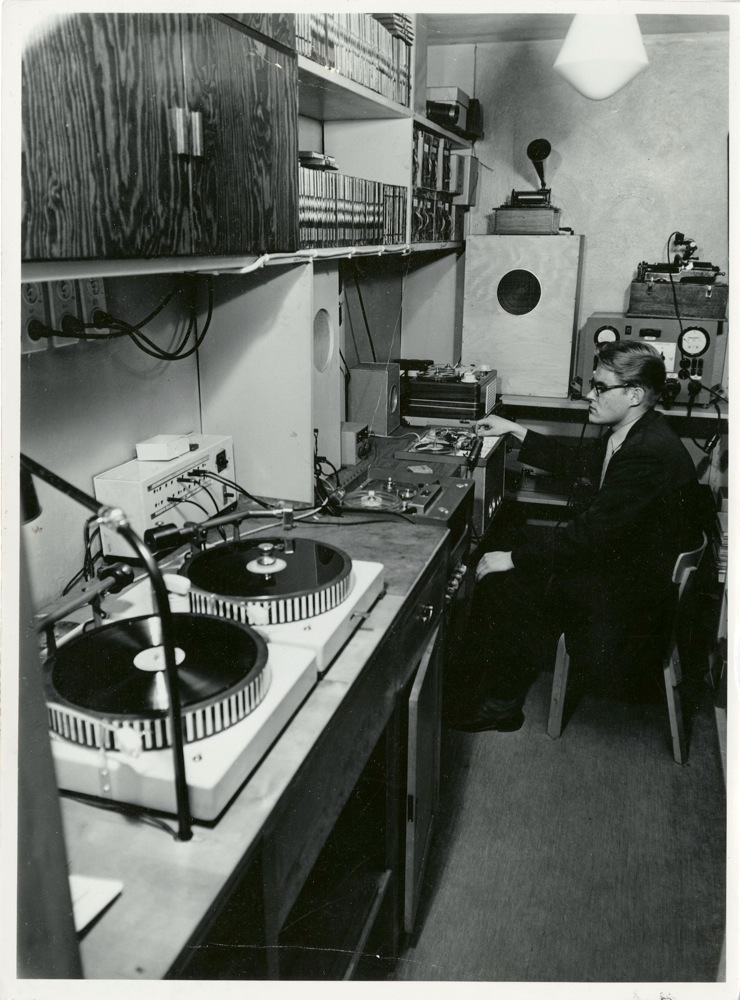
Lauri Honko in his student years, 1955

Lauri Olavi Honko (born in Hanko, 6 March 1932, died in Turku, 15 July 2002) was a Finnish professor of folklore studies and comparative religion.

== Life and work ==
Honko was a disciple of Martti Haavio. His 1959 doctoral dissertation at the University of Helsinki was titled Krankheitsprojektile. Untersuchung über eine urtümliche Krankheitserklärung (Disease Projectiles: A Study of the Primitive Explanation of Disease) and developed a special typology for the analysis of ethnographic data in folk medicine. Here, he put the Finnish folk tradition explanation of illness and healing into a global perspective and found distinct features and differences in geographical regions.

Honko's seminal work, Geisterglaube in Ingermanland (Belief in Spirits in Ingria) was very influential for Finnish folklorists because it set apart the old and new science of religion. In this work, he used new insights from social anthropology, phenomenology of religion, social psychology and sociology. Honko also interpreted the experience of guardian spirits in Ingrian peasant society by developing a genre-analytic and role-model theory.

In Geisterglaube in Ingermanland, he classified rituals into three main categories: rites of passage, calendrical rites, and crisis rites. Honko even stresses the importance of analyzing rituals within a cultural context and the need to differentiate between small-scale and complex systems of belief.

In 1961, Honko became an assistant professor in folklore studies and comparative religion. In 1963, he was an associate professor in both subjects at the University of Turku. In 1971, he received a special seat. In 1996, he was named professor emeritus.

Lauri Honko also became the head of the Nordic Institute of Folklore (NIF) in Turku in 1972. From 1974 to 1989, he was president of the International Society for Folk Narrative Research and then also the editor of Folklore Fellows' Communications. He was the editor of Temenos from 1965 to 1969 and from 1975 to 1990, of NIF Newsletters from 1972 onwards, and of Studia Fennica from 1981 to 1989.

During the 1980s and 1970s, Honko compared popular traditions and developed a research methodology.

== Bibliography ==
- Krankheitsprojektile: Untersuchung über eine urtümliche Krankheitserklärung. Helsinki 1959. (Folklore Fellows' communications. 178.)
- Geisterglaube in Ingermanland. Helsinki 1962. (Folklore Fellows' communications, 185.)
- Textualising the Siri epic. Helsinki 1998. (Folklore Fellows' communications, 264. Vol. 118.)

== Contributions ==
- Siikala, Anna-Leena: Honko, Lauri. In: Enzyklopädie des Märchens Vol. 6 (1990), Sp. 1236-1239.

== Relevant literature ==
- Honko, Lauri. 2013. Theoretical Milestones: Selected Writings of Lauri Honko. Suomalainen Tiedeakatemia, Academia Scientiarum Fennica.
