= Proto-religion =

Proto-religion may refer to:

== Religion ==
- Urreligion, a notion of an "original" or "oldest" form of religious tradition
- Early stages in the origin of religion in the course of human evolution
- Paleolithic religion, spiritual beliefs thought to have appeared during the Paleolithic time period

== Reconstructed proto-religion ==
- Proto-Indo-European religion, belief system adhered to by the Proto-Indo-Europeans
- Proto-Semitic religion, polytheistic religions of the Semitic peoples
