= Raffaele Pettazzoni =

Italian anthropologist, professor, and historian of religion (1883–1959)

Raffaele Pettazzoni (3 February 1883, in San Giovanni in Persiceto – 8 December 1959, in Rome) was an Italian anthropologist, archaeologist, professor, and historian of religion. He was one of the first academics to propose a historical approach to the study of religions. He was editor-in-chief of the academic journal Numen published by Brill Academic Publishers, and president of the International Association for the History of Religions from 1950 to 1959.

During his career as a historian of religion and scholar of Religious studies, which spans more than thirty years, Pettazzoni conducted several extensive researches on the Prehistoric religion of the ancient Italic peoples, Greek and Roman polytheism, Iranic religions, and the evolutionary origin of religions.

== Biography ==
Raffaele Pettazzoni was born 1883 in San Giovanni in Persiceto, province of Bologna, graduated in Italian literature, studied at the University of Bologna and specialized there in 1905 with a degree in archaeology at the Italian School of Archaeology. In 1909 he was appointed Inspector to the Prehistoric and Ethnographic Museum in Rome.

In 1923, he became professor of history at the Royal University of Rome, and in 1924 presented his first university course in the history of religion. Pettazzoni introduced this discipline in the Italian academic world and went on to become one of the most important figures in his homecountry. He became renowned as one of the first scholars to apply the methods of comparative history to the study of religions. Among his students in Rome there were also Angelo Brelich and Dario Sabbatucci, two other major historians of religion that have founded the so-called "Roman School" (Scuola di Roma). He served as director of the History of Religions and Folklore for the Italian Encyclopedia (Enciclopedia Italiana) from 1925 to 1937, in 1933 he was named Academic of Italy, and in 1938 signed the "Manifesto of Race" promulgated by the Fascist regime of Italy.

The above-mentioned issue concerning the endorsement of the "Manifesto" is controversial, since Pettazzoni's signature does not appear on the racial document published first on July 15, 1938, anonymously. At a later time, on July 25, a circular letter from the National Fascist Party (PNF) revealed the names of ten scholars who had either authored or supported the propositions, among whom Pettazzoni is not included. However, his name is in a list of approximately 330 names published in 1995, referring to a "Census of racists" or "List of Italian personalities who publicly supported the racist measures of the Fascist Regime", disclosed without citing the source where the list originated. It may refer to the "Census" promoted by the Ministry of National Education between August 19th and September 30th, 1938, aimed at identifying the presence of "Aryans" in scientific, literary, and artistic Italian institutions, in view of the Italian Racial Laws promulgated by the Fascist regime of Italy. This inquiry was conducted through self-declarations using questionnaires and information sheets submitted to the ministerial offices, including those from Pettazzoni at the Royal Academy of Italy.

Following the end of World War II, he became a member of the national Accademia dei Lincei, President of the International Association for the History of Religions (IAHR) in 1950, and editor-in-chief of the academic journal Numen. He retired from teaching at the end of the 1952–1953 academic year, having reached retirement age. He died in Rome in 1959.

== Influence ==
Pettazzoni was among the first to propose a historical approach to the study of religion and helped institutionalize the history of religion as an autonomous historical discipline in Italy. He founded the Roman School of history of religions (1920s) and the academic journal Studi e materiali di storia delle religioni (SMSR) [Studies and materials of history of religions] (1925). Comparison of different forms of religion are not limited to a single field, Pettazzoni writes in God's omniscience. His seven-hundred page work was the culmination of a lifetime of research that fundamentally challenged and undermined the speculative theories on the evolutionary origin of religions propounded by the Catholic priest Wilhelm Schmidt. During his studies of theology, he struggled against the Catholic Church's monopoly on Religious studies in Italy and against anti-clerical secularist academics, such as the Italian professor of philosophy Benedetto Croce, who held the study of religions to be an academically lazy and uninteresting discipline.

== Thought ==
A significant part of Pettazzoni's work on the study of ancient religions was devoted to refuting the speculative theory of "primordial monotheism" (Urmonotheismus) previously developed by the Catholic priest Wilhelm Schmidt, and the study of the conceptions of the Supreme Being in so-called "primitive" religions. Schmidt believed to have found evidence of monotheism in tribal societies, and argued that all human societies recognize the Supreme Being as a non-exclusive spiritual entity which is paramount but also opposed by other spiritual entities. Pettazzoni challenged Schmidt's concept of a Supreme Being as necessarily entailing monotheism. Rather, Pettazzoni writes that monotheism is a recent religious development over the course of a slow revolution in polytheism and perhaps henotheism. In the Hebrew Bible, this debate is carried on by the narrations on the Old Testament prophets who wrangle with the Canaanite gods, which serve to re-affirm both the ethical monotheism of the Israelites in opposition to the Canaanite religion and their belief in one exclusive transcendent deity coexisting with lesser divine beings. (See also: God in Abrahamic religions).

According to Pettazzoni's analysis, Schmidt confused science with theology, as he writes in the booklet The supreme being in primitive religions (1957). For Pettazzoni, the idea of a god in primitive religions is not an a priori concept independent of historical contexts; there is only the historical context, and arises from varying existential conditions within each type of human society. It is only within that societal context that the idea of God can satisfy, hence the Supreme Being does not exist a priori. Therefore, one finds the Supreme Being defined variously as the one who sends the rain, the protector of the hunt, or even as a life-giver associated with the soil and harvest in agrarian societies—unique historical contexts that give rise to their own particular conception of the Supreme Being. Pettazzoni argues that religion must be conceived first and foremost as a historical product, conditioned by historical, cultural, and social contexts, with unique influence on other social and cultural realities within the same human society that produced it.

As a historical product conditioned by variable socio-cultural circumstances, Pettazzoni noted that a plurality of stories corresponds to a plurality of religions: every nation has its own history and thus their religion and their answers to the great problems of humanity. What makes religion different from other social and cultural phenomena is its significance in the rites of passage: the religion, therefore, concerns the important moments of life of the individual. For Pettazzoni it is important in the study of religion to preserve a religion's specificity as a cultural product of human societies, and therefore requires a particular method of study. Specifically, Pettazzoni adopted comparative history, which shared much in common with the comparative method in classical anthropology, favored by British scientists studying affinities and analogies between cultures.

== Works ==
- Primitive religion in Sardinia, 1912
- The religion of Zarathustra in the religious history of Iran, 1920
- Religion in ancient Greece until Alexander, 1921
- God: training and development of monotheism (Vol. I: The heavenly beings in the beliefs of primitive peoples, 1922)
- Mysteries, 1924
- The confession of sins (3 vols., 1929–1935)
- Essays on the history of religion and mythology, 1946
- Myths and legends (4 vols., 1948–1963)
- Essays on the History of Religions, 1954
- The All-Knowing God, 1956 (it. ed. L'onniscienza di Dio, 1955)
- The supreme being in primitive religions, 1957
- Religion and Society (posthumously in 1966)
