= Urmonotheismus =

Hypothesis proposing monotheism as the original religion of humanity

The term Urmonotheismus (German for "primeval monotheism") or "primitive monotheism" expresses the hypothesis of a monotheistic Urreligion, from which polytheistic religions allegedly degenerated. This is one evolutionary view of religious development, which contrasts diametrically with another: that religion changed from pre-animism to animism, totemism, polytheism, and finally monotheism.

== History ==
In 1898, Scottish anthropologist Andrew Lang proposed that the idea of a Supreme Being (the "High God" or "All Father") existed among some of the simplest of contemporary tribal societies prior to their contact with Western peoples, and that Urmonotheismus ("primitive monotheism") was the original religion of humankind. This concept of a primeval monotheistic religion has parallels in the works of the early Christian theologian Tertullian and rabbinic literature.

Prussian linguist and Roman Catholic priest Wilhelm Schmidt (1868–1954) defended the hypothesis of Urmonotheismus in his work Der Ursprung der Gottesidee (The Origin of the Idea of God), published 1912 to 1955, opposing the "revolutionary monotheism" approach that traces the emergence of monotheistic thought as a gradual process spanning the Bronze and Iron Age religions of the ancient Near East and Classical antiquity. According to Schmidt, alleged traces of primitive monotheism appear in the Assyro-Babylonian deities Ashur and Marduk, and in the Ancient Hebrew god Yahweh. Schmidt views monotheism as the "natural" form of theism, which was later overlaid and "degraded" by polytheism after the deceased ancestors became objects of worship in primitive human societies, and personified natural forces became worshipped as well as divine beings.

A significant part of the work of Italian anthropologist and historian of religion Raffaele Pettazzoni (1883–1959) on the study of ancient religions concentrated on refuting the speculative theory of "primordial monotheism" (Urmonotheismus) previously developed by Schmidt, and on the study of the conceptions of the Supreme Being in so-called "primitive" religions. Schmidt believed that evidence of monotheism existed in tribal societies, and argued that all human societies recognize the Supreme Being as a non-exclusive spiritual entity which is paramount and also opposed by other spiritual entities. Pettazzoni challenged Schmidt's concept of a Supreme Being as necessarily entailing monotheism. Rather, Pettazzoni writes that monotheism is a recent religious development over the course of a slow revolution in polytheism and perhaps henotheism. In the Hebrew Bible, this debate is carried on by the narratives about the Old Testament prophets who wrangle with the Canaanite gods; such scenarios serve to re-affirm both the ethical monotheism of the Israelites in opposition to the Canaanite religion and their belief in one exclusive transcendent deity coexisting with lesser divine beings. (See also: God in Abrahamic religions).

Schmidt's hypothesis was controversially discussed during much of the first half of the 20th century. In the 1930s, Schmidt adduced evidence from Native American religion and mythology, Australian Aboriginal religion and mythology, and other primitive civilizations in support of his views. He also responded to his critics. For instance, he rejected Pettazzoni's claim that the sky gods were merely a dim personification or embodiment of the physical sky, writing in The Origin and Growth of Religion: "The outlines of the Supreme Being become dim only among later peoples". Schmidt added that "a being who lives in the sky, who stands behind the celestial phenomena, who must "centralize" in himself the various manifestations [of thunder, rain, etc.] is not a personification of the sky at all". According to Ernest Brandewie in Wilhelm Schmidt and the Origin of the Idea of God (1983), Schmidt claimed that Pettazzoni fails to study Schmidt's work seriously and often relies on incorrect translations of Schmidt's German. Brandewie also says Pettazzoni's definition of primitive ethical monotheism is an "arbitrary" straw-man argument, but he says Schmidt went too far when he claimed that such ethical monotheism was the earliest religious idea.

According to Pettazzoni's analysis, Schmidt confused science with theology, as Pettazzoni writes in the booklet The supreme being in primitive religions (1957). For Pettazzoni, the idea of a god in primitive religions is not an a priori concept independent of historical contexts; there is only the historical context, which arises from varying existential conditions within each type of human society. It is only within that societal context that the idea of God can satisfy, hence the Supreme Being does not exist a priori. Therefore, one finds the Supreme Being defined variously as the one who sends the rain, as the protector of the hunt, or even as a life-giver associated with the soil and harvest in agrarian societies—unique historical contexts that each give rise to their own particular conception of a Supreme Being. Pettazzoni argues that religion must be conceived first and foremost as a historical product, conditioned by historical, cultural, and social contexts, with unique influence on other social and cultural realities within the same human society that produced it.

By the 1950s, the academic establishment had rejected the hypothesis of primitive ethical monotheism (but not per se other proposed versions of Urmonotheismus), and the proponents of Schmidt's "Vienna school" rephrased his ideas to the effect that while ancient cultures may not have known "true monotheism", they at least show evidence for "original theism" (Urtheismus, as opposed to non-theistic animism), with a concept of Hochgott ("High God", as opposed to Eingott "Single God")—in effect, henotheism, which acknowledged the Supreme Being but also various lesser gods. Christian apologetics in the light of this have moved away from postulating a "memory of revelation" in pre-Christian religions, replacing it with an "inkling of redemption" or virtuous paganism unconsciously anticipating monotheism. That said, E. E. Evans-Pritchard noted in Theories of Primitive Religion, first published in 1962, that most anthropologists have abandoned all evolutionary schemes (such as Schmidt's or Pettazzoni's) for the historical development of religion, adding that they have also found monotheistic beliefs existing side-by-side with other religious beliefs.

== See also ==
- Anthropology of religion
  - Evolutionary origin of religions
  - History of religion
  - Prehistoric religion
- Classical theism
- Deism
  - Christian deism
  - Deus otiosus
  - Moralistic therapeutic deism
  - Unmoved mover
- Demythologization
- Ethical monotheism
- False god
- Fitra
- God gene
- Great Goddess
  - Goddess movement
  - Matriarchal religion
- Hanif
- Irreligion
  - Agnostic theism
  - Apatheism
  - Nontheism
  - Theological noncognitivism
- Naturalistic pantheism
- Neuroscience of religion
- Nontheistic religion
- Psychology of religion
- Religious instinct
- Religious naturalism
- Spiritual naturalism
- The One (Neoplatonism)
