= Soumendra Mohan Patnaik =

Indian academic and the former vice-chancellor of Utkal University, Odisha, India

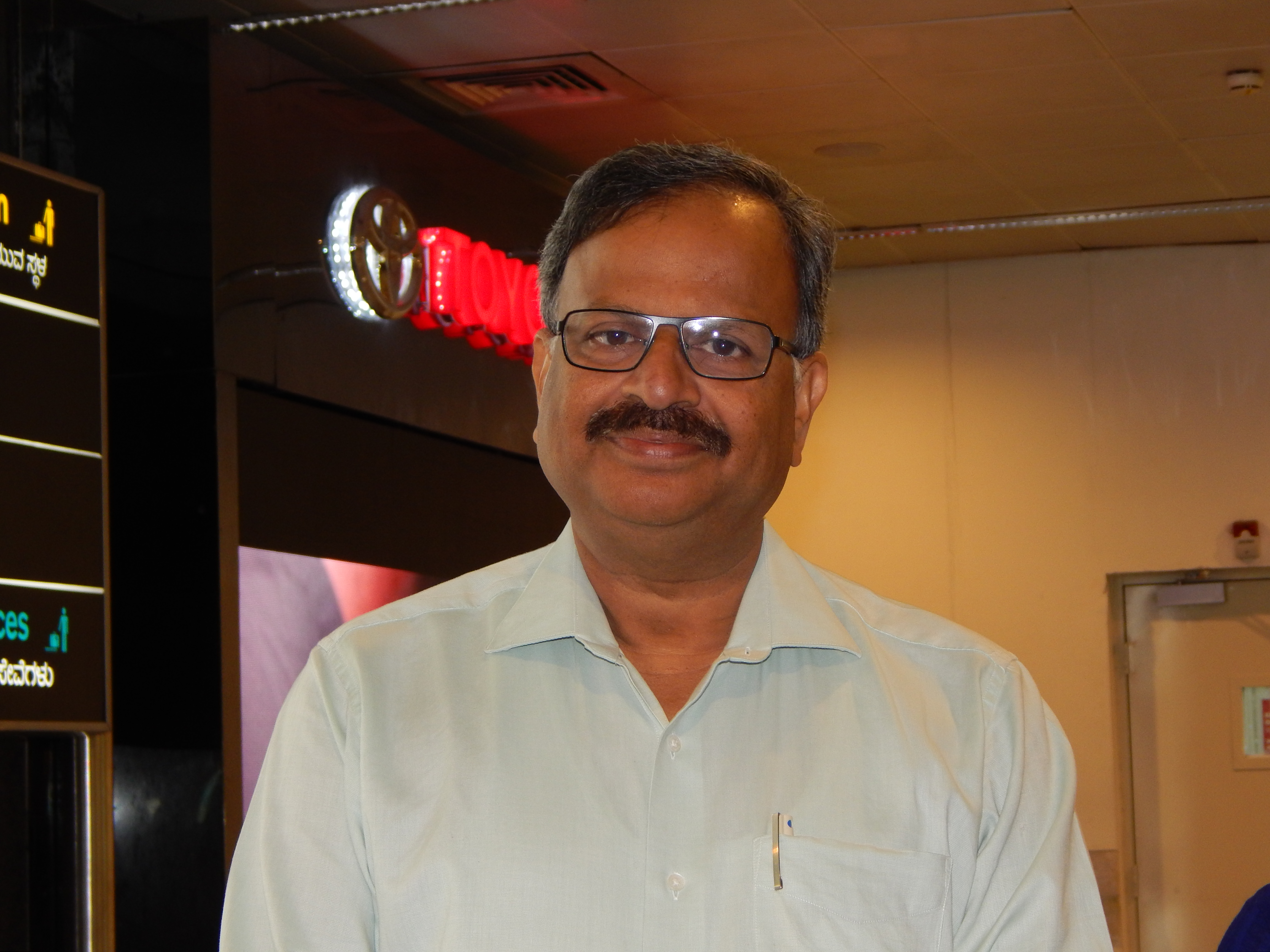
- Occupations: Academic, researcher

Academic background
- Education: University of Delhi

Academic work
- Discipline: Anthropology

Soumendra Mohan Patnaik (or S. M. Patnaik) is an Indian academic and the current vice-chancellor of Utkal University, Odisha, India.

== Education ==
Patnaik pursued his Ph. D in anthropology in 1994 from University of Delhi. He also pursued M.Sc (1983) and M. Phil (1986) in anthropology from the same university.

== Career ==
Patnaik is a professor of anthropology and has experience of teaching for more than two decades. In July 2017 Patnaik was appointed as the vice-chancellor of Utkal University, India. He replaced Ashok Das in this position. Before that he was working as a professor of anthropology at University of Delhi. He held the president's position at Indian Anthropological Association.

== Publications ==
Patnaik has authored 3 books and has published more than 30 research papers. The books he has written are:

- Culture, Identity and Development ISBN 9788131601280
- Displacement, rehabilitation, and social change: the case of the Paraja highlanders ISBN 9788121003575
- Indian Tribes and the Mainstream ISBN 9788131601037
