= Paul Leser =

German-American ethnologist

Paul Leser (February 23, 1899, in Frankfurt (Main) – December 22, 1984, in Hartford, Connecticut, United States) was a German-American ethnologist.

== Life ==
Paul Leser came from a well-to-do Jewish family in Frankfurt. His father was a provincial high court judge. Leser attended the Goethe-Gymnasium, Frankfurt from 1908 to 1917 and studied ethnology at the University of Bonn in 1919. He was a student of Fritz Graebner and was conferred a doctorate by him in March 1925. From 1928 until 1930 he was employed as a scientific laborer at the Museum for Ethnology in Frankfurt am Main. In 1929 he lectured at the Technical University at Darmstadt and became an associate professor for ethnology. From 1929 until 1933 he taught as an associate professor for ethnology on the Technical College of Darmstadt (Technische Hochschule Darmstadt). Leser was dismissed from his position in 1933. The study of Ethnology would subsequently not be offered any longer at TH Darmstadt.

Paul Leser was engaged in the German Youth movement in the Nerother Wandervogel. After the National Socialists forced the dissolution of this group, Leser founded the illegal Orden der Pachanten. In February 1936 he fled Germany over Denmark to Sweden, living in Stockholm. In the year 1942 he left to the United States. After he worked for the United States Army, he fought in North Africa and Italy and taught in several American universities, including Olivet College from 1947 to 1949, Black Mountain College from 1949 to 1951, the Hartford Seminary Foundation from 1951 to 1967, and a visiting post at the New School for Social Research in 1957. As a guest professor he worked at the Universität Köln in 1958 and 1966-7 at the University of Vienna. In 1968 he was the president of the Standing International Committee for the Research of the History of Cultivation Tools (der ständige Internationale Ausschuss für die Erforschung der Geschichte der Bodenbaugeräte).

His main scientific work is the 1931 book, "Genesis and Propagation of the Plow" (Entstehung und Verbreitung des Pfluges). In almost 700 pages Leser gives an overview of collected plow-forms of the world, with about 300 illustrations and a critical description of the different theories of the genesis of this important tool for working ground in cultivation.

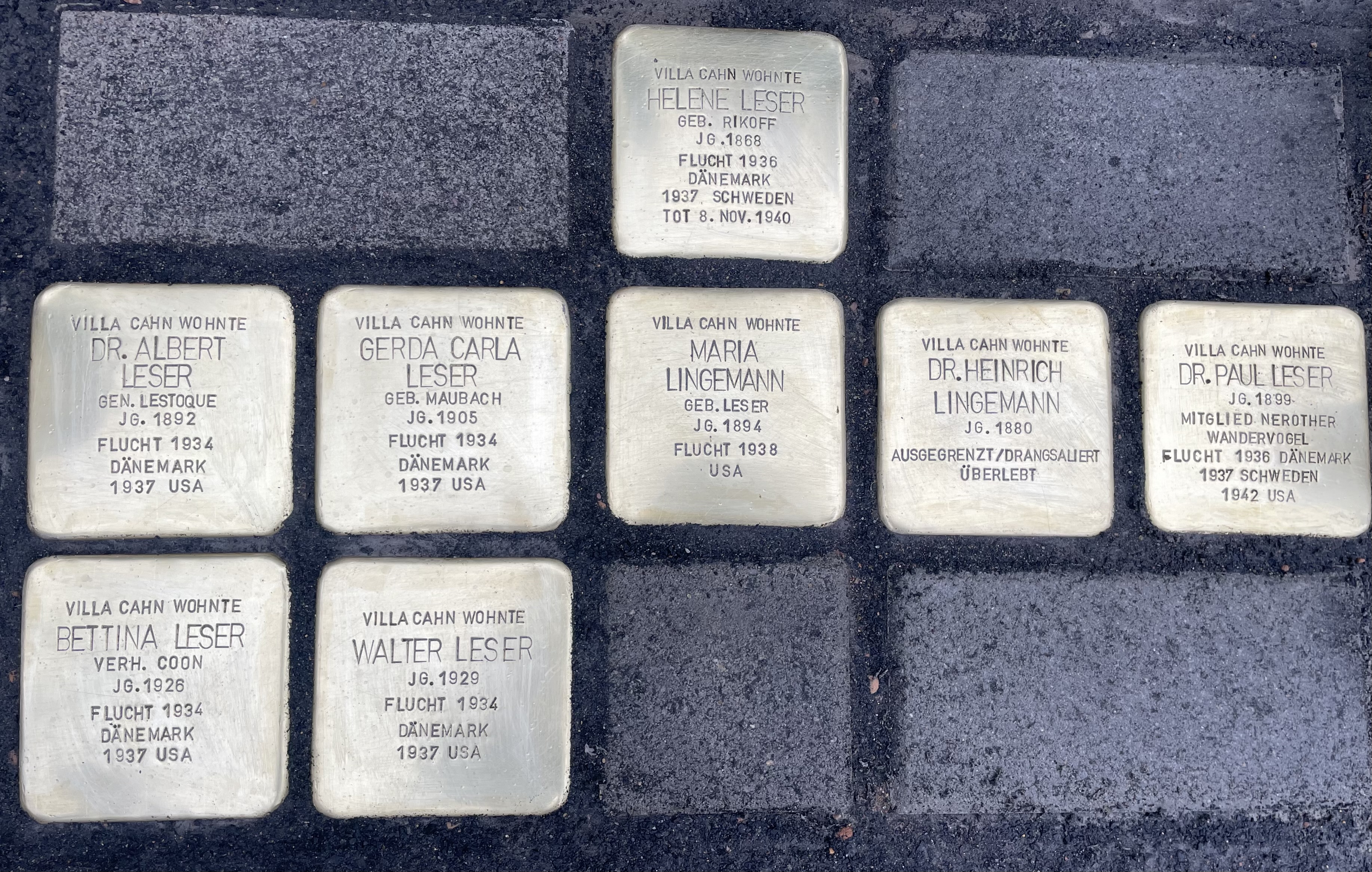
Stolpersteine laid for the Leser family in front of their former home, along the Rhine in Plittersdorf-Bonn.

On 17 November 2023, Stolpersteine ("stumbling stones") were laid along the Rhine in Plittersdorf-Bonn for Leser and seven of his family members in front of their former home, the Villa Cahn. The mayor of Bonn, Katja Dörner, made remarks to a crowd of interested locals. Members of her Green Party raised the funds to pay for the stones. The garden and villa were beautifully restored by entrepreneur Frank Asbeck, with artifacts and memorabilia contributed by the Leser family.

== Honors ==
- 1969: Honorary member of the Berlin Anthropological Society

== Main work ==
- Entstehung und Verbreitung des Pfluges. Aschendorffsche Verlagsbuchhandlung Münster i. W. 1931 = Anthropos-Bibliothek Bd. 3, H. 3. – Reprint-Ausgabe herausgegeben von: The International Secretariat for Research on the History of Agricultural Implements, National Museum, Brede. Lyngby (Denmark) 1971. Hier Kurzbiographie u. Foto von Paul Leser, sowie Bibliographie seiner Schriften bis 1970.

== Literature ==
- Bibliography Paul Leser. On the Occasion of his 80th Birthday on February 23, 1979. Edited by Absalom Vilakazi. University of Hartford, West Hartford, Conn. 1979.
- Isabel Schmidt: Die TH Darmstadt in der Nachkriegszeit (1945-1960), Dissertation, Darmstadt 2014.
- Christa Wolf und Marianne Viefhaus: Verzeichnis der Hochschullehrer der TH Darmstadt, Darmstadt 1977, S. 123.
