= Religious instinct =

Hypothesized part of human nature

Religious instinct has been hypothesized by some scholars as a part of human nature. Support for such a position being found in the fact that (as Talcott Parsons put it) "there is no known human society without something which modern social scientists would classify as religion".

== Observations ==
Archaeologists have established the existence of burial rituals among Neanderthals some 50,000 years ago: their appearance has sometimes been taken as evidence of the human capacity to transform instinct, rather than to be driven by it.

== Freud and Jung ==
Sigmund Freud saw human weakness and helplessness as a fundamental force behind the establishment of religion, a view which might seem to draw support from the Inglehart–Welzel thesis that links the insecurities of traditional economies to a search for spiritual certainty, the affluence of modernization to a declining stress on religion.

Carl Jung (1875–1961) theorized the existence of a collective unconscious, as a residue of what has been learned in humankind's evolution and ancestral past, which contains the instinctual potential for creativity as well as the spiritual heritage of mankind, and which unconsciously dictates our behavior.

While he recognized in man a genetic predisposition to order experience in mythological, religious or symbolic terms, Jung reserved judgement as to what bearing this had for the truth-value of religion.

He never ceased however to stress the important challenge all such factors presented to any shallowly rationalistic world-view.

== Criticism ==
Émile Durkheim saw the social, not the instinctual side of mankind, as the key to their religious experience.

Theologians have questioned the utility of an approach to religion by way of a so-called instinct; psychologists have disputed the existence of any such specific instinct; while others would point to the advance of secularization in the modern world as refuting the assumption of a specific religious instinct inevitably leading to the establishment of religion as a fundamental human institution.

Additionally, there are no religious rituals observed in animals, including our close relatives, chimpanzees and other apes, although chimps were observed to have sometimes collective excitements for no reason.

== See also ==
- Cognitive science of religion
- Evolutionary origin of religions
- God gene
- Neurotheology
