= Wilhelm Schmidt (linguist) =

German Catholic priest and linguist (1868–1954)

The Reverend Wilhelm Schmidt SVD
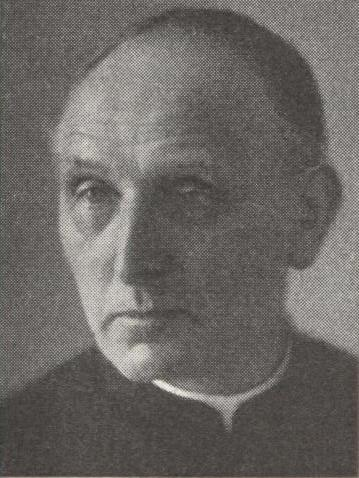
- Wilhelm Schmidt
- Born: February 16, 1868; Hörde, Province of Westphalia, Prussia
- Died: February 10, 1954 (aged 85); Freiburg im Üechtland, Switzerland

Academic work
- Notable ideas: Austric languages Urmonotheismus
- Influenced: Stephen Fuchs

Wilhelm Schmidt SVD (February 16, 1868 — February 10, 1954) was a German-Austrian Catholic priest, linguist and ethnologist. He presided over the Fourth International Congress of Anthropological and Ethnological Sciences that was held at Vienna in 1952.

== Biography ==
Wilhelm Schmidt, born in Hörde, Germany in 1868, entered the Society of the Divine Word in 1890 and was ordained as a Roman Catholic priest in 1892. He studied linguistics at the universities of Berlin and Vienna.

Schmidt’s main passion was linguistics. He spent many years in study of languages around the world. His early work focussed on the Mon–Khmer languages of Southeast Asia, and on languages of Oceania and Australia. The conclusions from this study led him to hypothesize the existence of a broader Austric group of languages, which included the Austronesian language group.

From 1912 to his death in 1954, Schmidt published his 12-volume work Der Ursprung der Gottesidee (The Origin of the Idea of God). In it he explained his theory of primitive monotheism: the belief that primitive religion among almost all tribal peoples began with an essentially monotheistic concept of a high god — usually a sky god — who was a benevolent creator. Schmidt theorized that human beings believed in a God who was the First Cause of all things and Ruler of Heaven and Earth before men and women began to worship a number of gods:

- "Schmidt suggested that there had been a primitive monotheism before men and women had started to worship a number of gods. Originally they had acknowledged only one Supreme Deity, who had created the world and governed human affairs from afar."

In 1906, Schmidt founded the journal Anthropos, and in 1931, the Anthropos Institute, both of which still exist today. In 1938, Schmidt and the Institute fled from Nazi-occupied Austria to Fribourg, Switzerland. He died there in 1954.

His works available in English translation are: The Origin and Growth of Religion: Facts and Theories (1931), High Gods in North America (1933), The Culture Historical Method of Ethnology (1939), and Primitive Revelation (1939).

On Primitive Revelation, Eric J. Sharpe has said: "Schmidt did believe the emergent data of historical ethnology to be fundamentally in accord with biblical revelation—a point which he made in Die Uroffenbarung als Anfang der Offenbarung Gottes (1913) . . . A revised and augmented version of this apologetical monograph was published in an English translation as Primitive Revelation (Sharpe 1939)."

== See also ==
- Anthropos-Bibliothek
- Robert Holcot
- Anthropos phonetic alphabet
