= Roman School (history of religion) =

History of religion methodology

In the history of religions, the Roman School (Italian: Scuola romana di Storia delle religioni) is a methodology that emerged after World War II and was prominent in Italy throughout the 1950s. It was a competitor to the French structuralist approach.

One of its main characteristics was the ambition to study religion from a neutral or politically aloof perspective. It began with Raffaele Pettazzoni, who had been one of the first academics to propose a historical approach to the study of religion. One of its most influential contributors was Angelo Brelich, whose works on rituals and initiation have had a lasting impact. Other prominent disciples of the Roman School include Dario Sabbatucci and Giulia Piccaluga.

The school and its body of work have been examined by later scholars including Giampiera Arrigoni and Marcello Massenzio.
