= Georg Friederici =

German ethnologist and historian

Carl Georg Eduard Friederici
- Born: 28 January 1866; Stettin, Kingdom of Prussia
- Died: 15 April 1947 (aged 81); Ahrensburg, Holstein, Germany
- Occupation: Ethnologist

Carl Georg Eduard Friederici (28 January 1866 – 15 April 1947) was a German ethnologist. He wrote extensively on the customs and language of peoples affected by European colonization in America and Oceania.

== Life ==
Carl Georg Eduard Friederici was born on 28 January 1866 in Stettin. His father, Carl Friederici (1832–83), was a wine wholesaler. His mother was Emilie Schultze (1836–1901), daughter of a baker. He made his career in the army, but from an early age was interested in the history and peoples of foreign lands. In 1893–94 he took leave and traveled in Spain and North Africa.

Friederici was the military attaché at the German embassy in Washington from 1894 to 1895, and took the opportunity to travel through the United States, Cuba and Canada and to conduct research in the libraries of New York City and Washington, D.C. His 1900 Indianer und Anglo-Amerikaner (Indians and Anglo-Americans) described the history and differences in treatment of the Indians in the United States and Canada. A reviewer wrote, "The author shows close familiarity with the literature of the subject, and every statement is substantiated by authoritative reference." In 1900 Friederici campaigned in China during the Boxer Rebellion. He was a captain and company commander when he left the Prussian army in September 1903. He then devoted himself to the study of ethnology, history and geography in Tübingen, Göttingen and Leipzig. He received a PhD from Leipzig.

In 1908 the Imperial Colonial Office sent Friederici and Karl Sapper to the Pacific. They studied the Bismarck Archipelago in 1908–09. In 1909 Friederici was head of an expedition in German New Guinea and in the English and French possessions of the Pacific. In 1909–10 he made another research trip to German and Dutch New Guinea. He worked on his findings for several years, but was called back to military service with the outbreak of World War I (1914–18). After being discharged he moved to Ahrensburg, Holstein where he built a large library on the history of exploration of America and Oceania. He continued his studies until his death on 15 April 1947 in Ahrensburg.

== Work ==
Friederici researched the history of exploration from old sources. He also undertook the comparative study of native languages, particularly those affected by European colonization. He used his military knowledge in his many writings on weapons and war methods of foreign nations. His publications included:

- Indianer und Anglo-Amerikaner: Ein geschichtlicher Überblick(Indians and Anglo-Americans: A Historical Overview) (in German). Braunschweig. 1900.
- Berittene Infanterie in China (Mounted infantry in China) (in German). Berlin. 1904.
- "Die Ethnographie in d. "Documentos Inéditos del Archivo de Indias" (Ethnology in the Unedited Documents of the Archives of the Indies)". Globus 90 (in German). 1906.
- Skalpieren u. ähnl. Kriegsgebräuche in Amerika (Scalping and similar War customs in America) (in German). (Dissertation). 1906.
- Ein Beitrag zur Kenntnis der Tuamotu-Inseln (A contribution to the knowledge of the Tuamotu Islands) (in German). Leipzig. 1911.
- Beiträge zur Völker- und Sprachenkunde von Deutsch-Neuguinea (Contributions on the people and linguistics of German New Guinea) (in German). Berlin. 1912.
- Wiss. Ergebnisse e. amtl. Forschungsreise nach d. Bismarck-Archipel im J. 1908 (Results of a Research Trip to the Bismarck Archipelago in 1908) (in German). 1912.
- Untersuchungen über eine melanesische Wanderstraße (Studies on a Melanesian journey) (in German). Berlin. 1913.
- Ein Beitrag zur Kenntnis der Trutzwaffen der Indonesier, Südseevölker und Indianer (A contribution to the knowledge of weapons of the Indonesians, Pacific peoples and Indians) (in German). Leipzig and Berlin: Teubner. 1915.
- Das puritan. Neu-England (The Puritan. New England) (in German). 1924.
- Hilfswörterbuch für den Amerikanisten (Auxiliary dictionary for Americanists) (in German). Halle: M. Niemeyer. 1926.
- Der Charakter der Entdeckung und Eroberung Amerikas durch die Europäer (The character of the discovery and conquest of America by the Europeans ) (in German). Vol. 1–3. 1925–36.

== Sources ==
- "Friederici". Deutsches Kolonial-Lexikon (in German). Vol. I. 1920. Archived from the original on 2013-10-30.
- Mooney, James (1900). "Indianer und Anglo- Amerikaner ... (review)". American Anthropologist. 2 (3): 585. doi:10.1525/aa.1900.2.3.02a00140.
- Trimborn, Hermann (1961). "Friederici, Georg". Neue Deutsche Biographie (in German). Vol. 5.
