= God gene =

Hypothesis proposing that human spirituality is influenced by heredity

The God gene hypothesis proposes that human spirituality is influenced by heredity and that a specific gene, called vesicular monoamine transporter 2 (VMAT2), predisposes humans towards spiritual or mystic experiences. The idea has been proposed by geneticist Dean Hamer in the 2004 book called The God Gene: How Faith is Hardwired into our Genes.

The God gene hypothesis is based on a combination of behavioral genetic, neurobiological and psychological studies. The major arguments of the hypothesis are: (1) spirituality can be quantified by psychometric measurements; (2) the underlying tendency to spirituality is partially heritable; (3) part of this heritability can be attributed to the gene VMAT2; (4) this gene acts by altering monoamine levels; and (5) spirituality provides an evolutionary advantage by providing individuals with an innate sense of optimism.

== Proposal ==
According to the God Gene hypothesis, spirituality has a genetic component, of which (VMAT2) comprises one component by contributing to sensations associated with mystic experiences, including the presence of God and feelings of connection to a larger universe.

The research uses the self-transcendence scale developed by psychologist Robert Cloninger to quantify spirituality using three sub-scales: "self-forgetfulness" (as in the tendency to become totally absorbed in some activity, such as reading); "transpersonal identification" (a feeling of connectedness to a larger universe); and "mysticism" (an openness to believe things that remain unproven, such as ESP). Cloninger suggests that taken together, these measurements are a reasonable way to quantify (make measurable) an individual's propensity to be spiritual.

The self-transcendence measure was shown to be heritable by classical twin studies conducted by Lindon Eaves and Nicholas Martin. Their work demonstrated that approximately 40% of the variation in self-transcendence was due to genes. By contrast, specific religious beliefs (such as belief in a particular deity) were found to have no genetic basis and are instead cultural units or memes. Similar conclusions were drawn from studies of identical twins reared apart.

In order to identify some of the specific genes involved in self-transcendence, Hamer analyzed DNA and personality score data from over 1,000 individuals and identified one particular locus, VMAT2, with a significant correlation. VMAT2 codes for a vesicular monoamine transporter that plays a key role in regulating the levels of the brain chemicals serotonin, dopamine and norepinephrine. These monoamine transmitters are in turn postulated to play an important role in regulating the brain activities associated with mystic beliefs.

Hamer hypothesized that self-transcendence might provide an evolutionary advantage by providing human beings with an innate sense of optimism that gives people the will to keep on living and procreating, despite the inevitability of death, and promoting better health and recovery from diseases.

== Scientific response ==
In the brain, VMAT2 proteins are located on synaptic vesicles. VMAT2 transports monoamine neurotransmitters from the cytosol of monoamine neurons into vesicles. Developmental biologist and science blogger PZ Myers argues: "It's a pump. A teeny-tiny pump responsible for packaging a neurotransmitter for export during brain activity. Yes, it's important, and it may even be active and necessary during higher order processing, like religious thought. But one thing it isn't is a 'god gene.'"

Popular science writer Carl Zimmer said that VMAT2 can be characterized as a gene that accounts for less than one percent of the variance of self-transcendence scores. These, Zimmer says, can signify anything from belonging to the Green Party to believing in ESP. Zimmer also points out that the God Gene theory is based on only one unpublished, unreplicated study.

However, Hamer notes that the importance of the VMAT2 finding is not that it explains all spiritual or religious feelings, but rather that it points the way toward one neurobiological pathway that may be important. Currently, there are several VMAT2 inhibitors marketed as drugs including deutetrabenazine, tetrabenazine, and valbenazine. The question of the God Gene could be answered by experimental studies.

== Religious response ==
John Polkinghorne, a theoretical physicist and Anglican priest, member of the Royal Society and Canon Theologian at Liverpool Cathedral, was asked for a comment on Hamer's theory by the British national daily newspaper, The Daily Telegraph. He replied: "The idea of a God gene goes against all my personal theological convictions. You can't cut faith down to the lowest common denominator of genetic survival. It shows the poverty of reductionist thinking."

Walter Houston, the chaplain of Mansfield College, Oxford, and a fellow in theology, told the Telegraph: "Religious belief is not just related to a person's constitution; it's related to society, tradition, character—everything's involved. Having a gene that could do all that seems pretty unlikely to me."

Hamer responded that the existence of such a gene would not be incompatible with the existence of a personal God: "Religious believers can point to the existence of God genes as one more sign of the creator's ingenuity—a clever way to help humans acknowledge and embrace a divine presence." He repeatedly notes in his book that, "This book is about whether God genes exist, not about whether there is a God."

== See also ==
- Cognitive science of religion
- Evolutionary origin of religions
- Neurotheology
- Religious instinct

== Sources ==
- The God Gene: How Faith Is Hardwired Into Our Genes by Dean Hamer. Published by Doubleday, ISBN 0-385-50058-0.
