= Anthropos phonetic alphabet =

Phonetic alphabet developed in the 1900s

- Script type: Alphabet
- Period: 1907 to 1940s
- Languages: Reserved for phonetic transcription of any language

Related scripts
- Parent systems: Latin alphabet: Anthropos phonetic alphabet

The Anthropos phonetic alphabet is a phonetic transcription system that was to be used in the journal Anthropos, originally published by Wilhelm Schmidt in 1907. Transcription is italic, without other delimiters. It shares similarities with Karl Richard Lepsius' Standard Alphabet or some Americanist phonetic notations Edward Sapir and Franz Boas introduced to the United States.

== Consonants ==
Anthropos alphabet (1907)
		Labial		Coronal ("Dental")			Palatal	Dorsal ("Guttural")			Pharyn- geal	Epi- glottal	Glottal
		Bilabial	Labio- dental	Inter- dental	Alveolar	Retroflex	Palatal	Pre- velar	Velar	Uvular	Pharyn- geal	Epi- glottal	Glottal
Plosive	voiceless	p		t̯	t	ṭ	c	k̯	k	ḳ			ʼ
Plosive	voiced	b		d̯	d	ḍ	j	g̯	g	g̣		ꜣ	
Affricate	voiceless	p̌ (pf)		t͏̯̌ (t̯s̯)	t͏̌ (ts)	ṭ̌ (ṭṣ)	č (tš)	ǩ̯ (k̯x̯)	ǩ (kx)	ḳ̌ (ḳx̣)			
Affricate	voiced	b̌ (bv)		d͏̯̌ (d̯z̯)	d͏̌ (dz)	ḍ̌ (ḍẓ)	ǰ (dž)	ǧ̯ (g̯y)	ǧ (gÿ)	ǧ̣ (g̣ỵ̈)			
Fricative	voiceless	ff (f̯)	f	s̯	s	ṣ	š	x̯	x	x̣	ḥ	h́	h
Fricative	voiced	w	v	z̯	z	ẓ	ž	y	ÿ	ỵ̈		ꜣ	
Rhotic				r̯ ꭈ̯	r ꭈ	ṛ ꭈ̣		ꭉ̯ ꭊ̯	ꭉ ꭊ	ꭉ̣ ꭊ̣			
Lateral flap					𝼑								
Lateral liquid				l̯	l	ḷ	(ĺ)		ɫ				
Lateral affricate	voiceless				t̪ (t̰)				k̪ (k̰)				
Lateral affricate	voiced				d̪ (d̰)				g̪ (g̰)				
Lateral fricative	voiceless				s̪ (s̰)				x̪ (x̰)				
Lateral fricative	voiced				z̪ (z̰)				y̪ (y̰)				
Nasal		m ꬺ (ṁ)		n̯	n	ṇ	(ń)	ꬻ̯	ꬻ (ṅ)	ꬻ̣			
Prenasalized?	voiceless	p̰			t̰				k̰				
Prenasalized?	voiced	b̰			d̰				g̰				
Ejective		p̓			t̕				k̓				
Ingressive		p			ʇ	ʇ̣	ɔ		ʞ				

Palatalized consonants are written with an acute – t́ d́ ć j́ ś ź ĺ ń etc. Semivowels are i̯ u̯ ü̯ o̯ e̯ etc.

=== Vowels ===
Vowels are inconsistent between languages. ï ë etc. may be used for unrounded central vowels, and the ⟨a⟩-based letters are poorly defined, with height and rounding confounded.

Anthropos (semi)vowels (1907)
		Front		Central		Back	
		unround	round	unround	round	unround	round
Semivowel		i̯	ü̯	ī̯	ū̯	ï̯	u̯
High	higher	i	ü	ī (ï)	ū	ï	u
High	lower	i̠	ü̠	ī̠	ū̠	ï̠	u̠
Mid	higher	ẹ	ọ̈	ẹ̄	ọ̄	ẹ̈	ọ
Mid	mid	e	ö	ē (ë)	ō	ë	o
Mid	lower	e̠	ö̠	ē̠	ō̠	ë̠	o̠
Low	higher	a̤̣					a̰̣
Low	mid	a̤ ạ		ä		a̰ a̠	
Low	lower			a			

There are actually three heights of low front and back vowels. ā is also seen for a low back vowel.

Reduced (obscure) vowels are i̥ e̥ ḁ etc. There are also extra-high vowels ị ụ etc.
