= Urreligion =

Form of religious tradition

Urreligion is a postulated "original" or "oldest" form of religious tradition (the German prefix ur- expressing the idea of "original", "primal", "primitive", "elder", "primeval", or "proto-"). The concept contrasts with later organized religions such as the early theocracies of the Ancient Near East and in later world religions. The term Urreligion originated in the context of German Romanticism.

== History ==
Friedrich Creuzer put forward the notion of a monotheistic primeval religion in 1810 – an idea taken up by other authors of the Romantic period, such as J. J. Bachofen, but decidedly opposed by Johann Heinrich Voss. Goethe, in a conversation with Eckermann on 11 March 1832, discussed the human Urreligion, which he characterized as "pure nature and [pure] reason, of divine origin". The final scene of his Faust Part Two (1832) has been taken as evoking "the 'Urreligion' of mankind".

Often used in the sense of natural religion or indigenous religion, the religious behaviour of pre-modern tribal societies such as shamanism, animism and ancestor worship (e.g. Australian aboriginal mythology), the term Urreligion has also been used by adherents of various religions to back up the claim that their own religion is somehow "primeval" or "older" than competing traditions. In the context of a given religious faith, literal belief in a creation may be the base of primality. (e.g. Biblical literalism, or literal belief in the Hindu Puranas).

In particular, Urmonotheismus comprises the historical claim that primeval religion was monotheistic. Some have rejected this hypothesis, and certain Christian apologetics circles defend it.

Nineteenth-century Germanic mysticism sometimes claimed that the Germanic runes bore testimony of a primeval religion.

== See also ==
- Ancient Semitic religion
- Paleolithic religion
- Perennial philosophy
- Prehistoric religion
- Proto-religion (disambiguation)
- Proto-Indo-European religion
- Evolutionary origin of religions
- Traditionalist school
- UR Group
- Tradition (perennialism)
