= Wilhelm Koppers =

Austrian Catholic priest and cultural anthropologist (1886–1961)

Wilhelm Koppers (1886–1961) was an Austrian Catholic priest and cultural anthropologist.
