= List of Trinity College (Connecticut) people =

Here is a list of notable people affiliated with Trinity College. It includes alumni, attendees, faculty, and presidents of the college.

Select Alumni

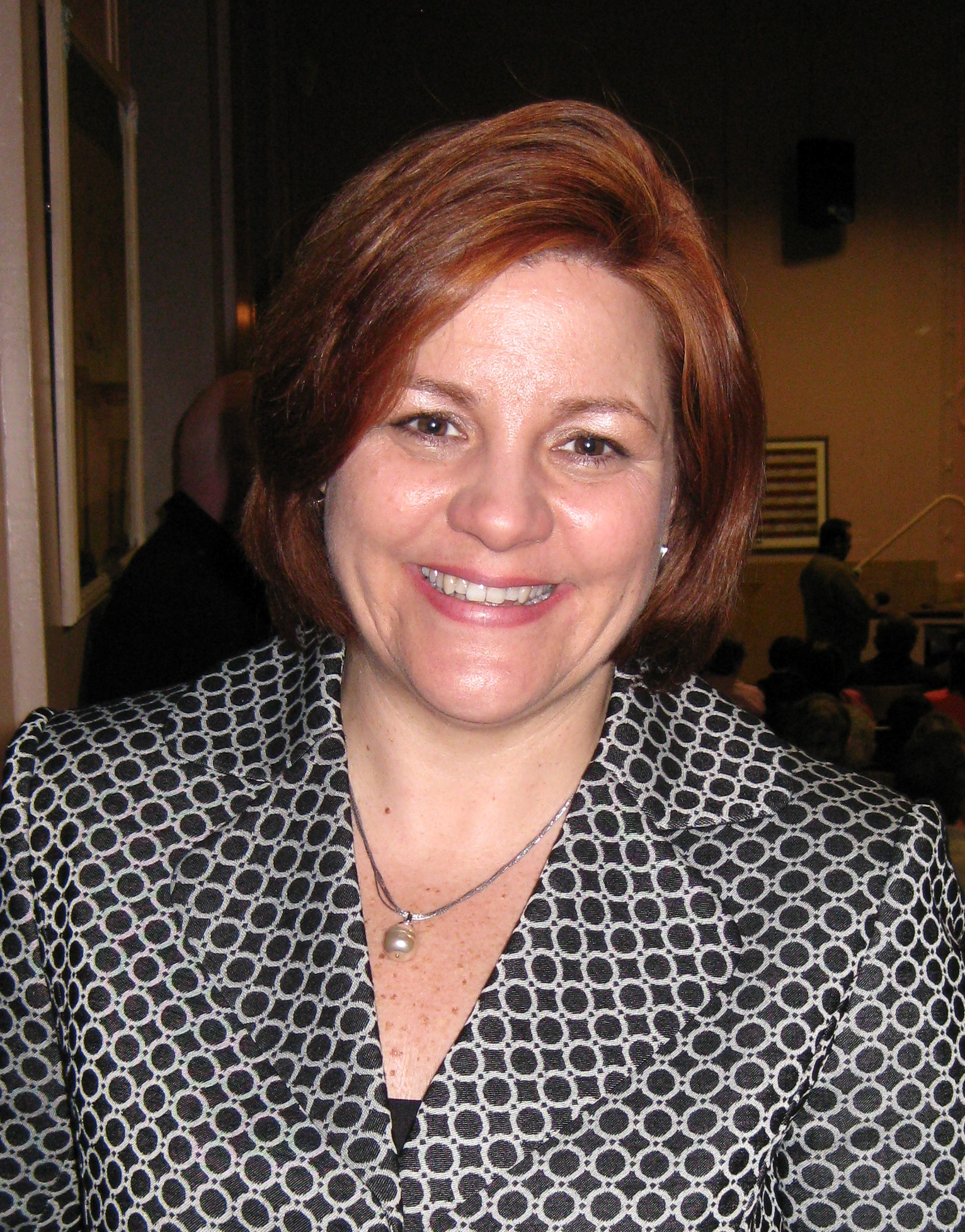
Christine C. Quinn, Speaker of the New York City Council

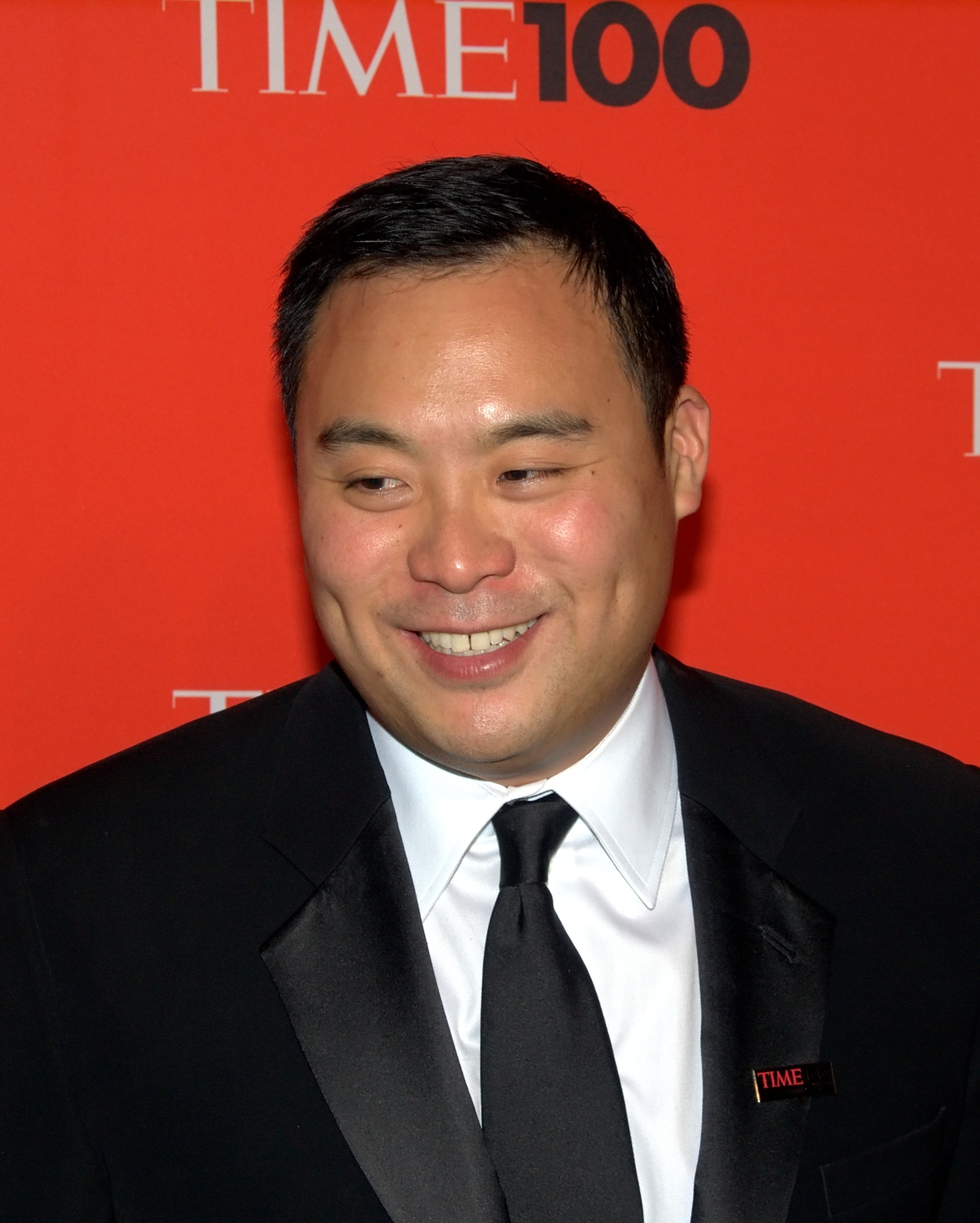
David Chang, New York restaurateur, on Time's list of 100 most influential people, 2010

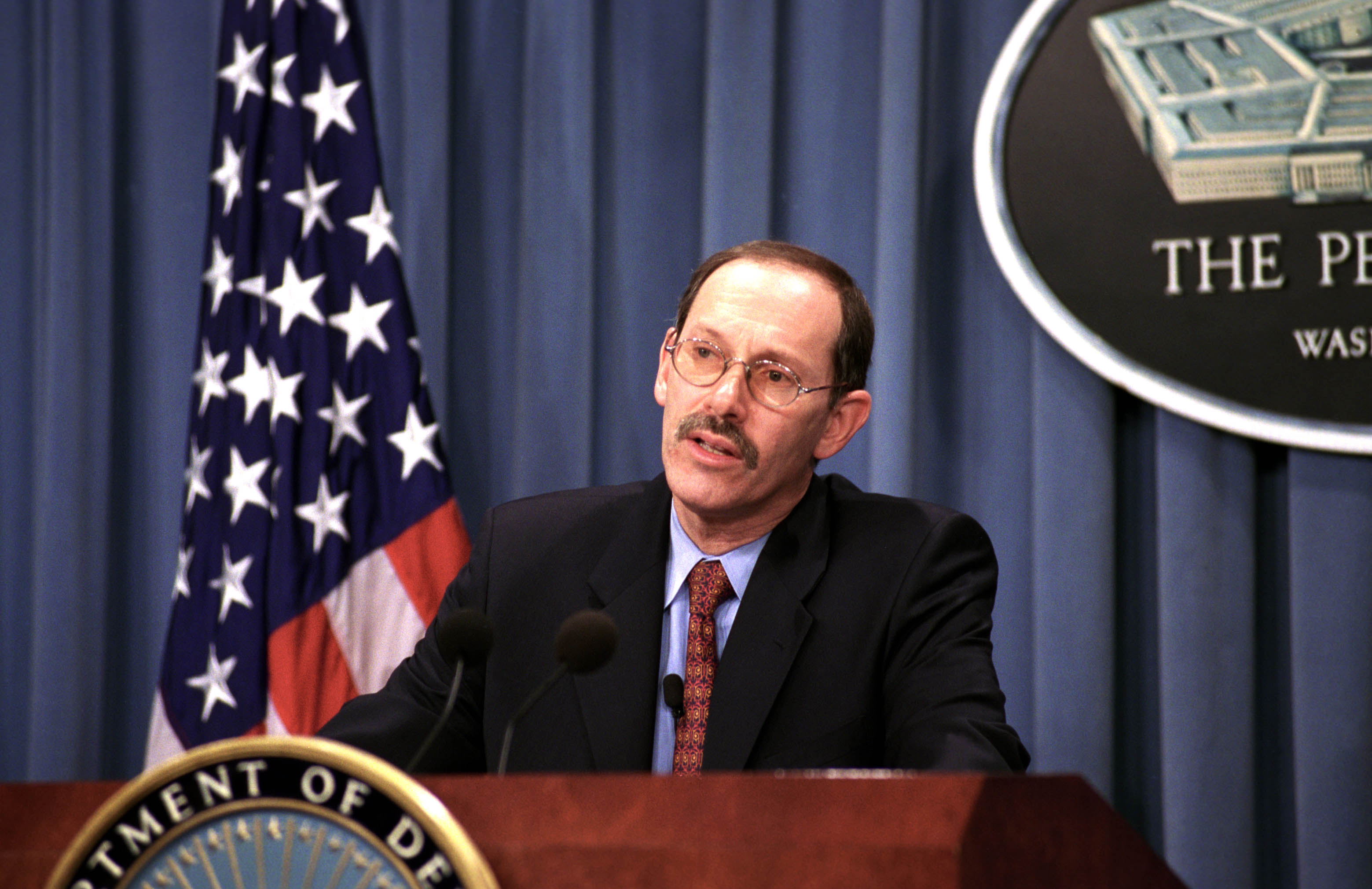
Dov Zakheim, Undersecretary of Defense and comptroller at the Department of Defense

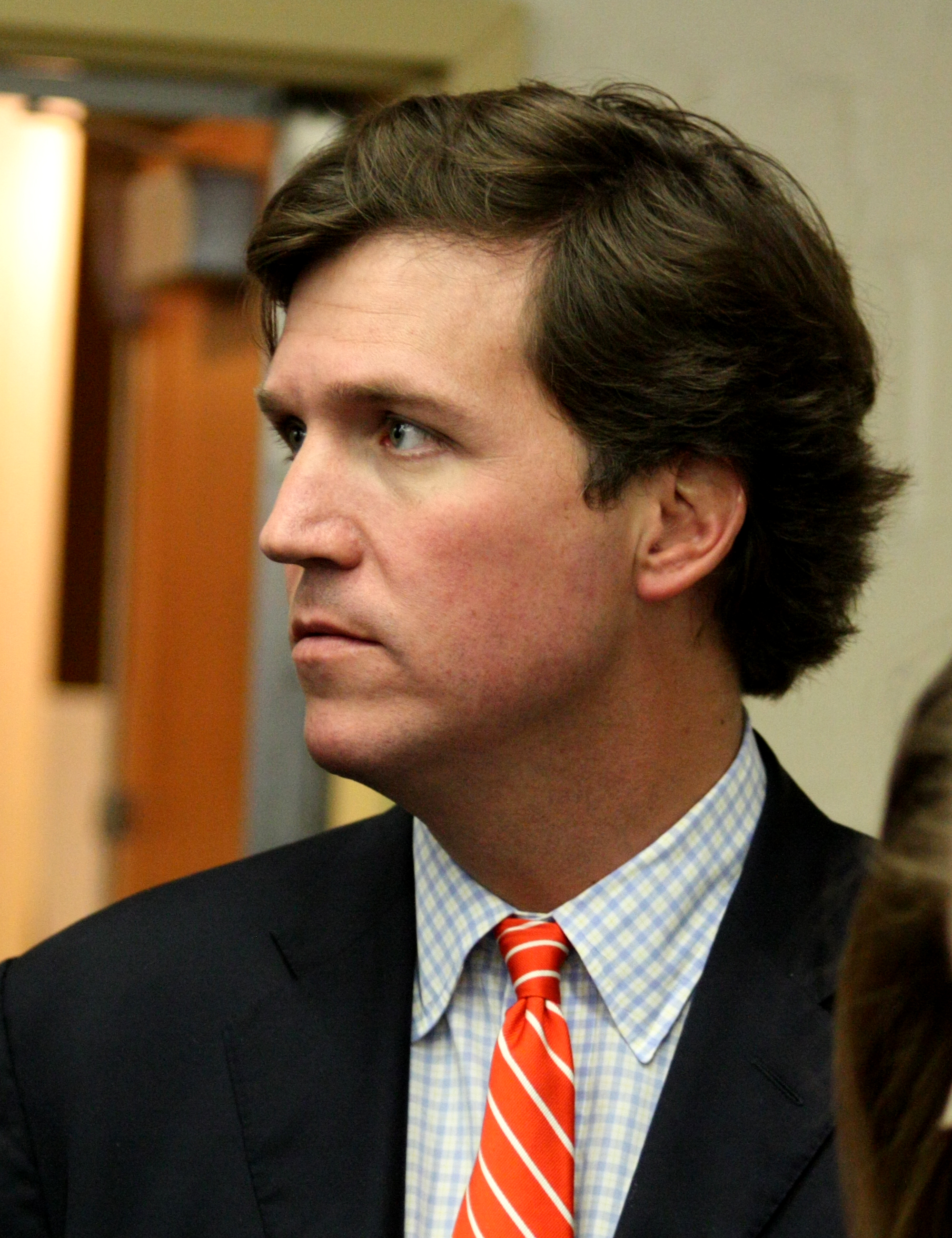
Tucker Carlson, political news correspondent

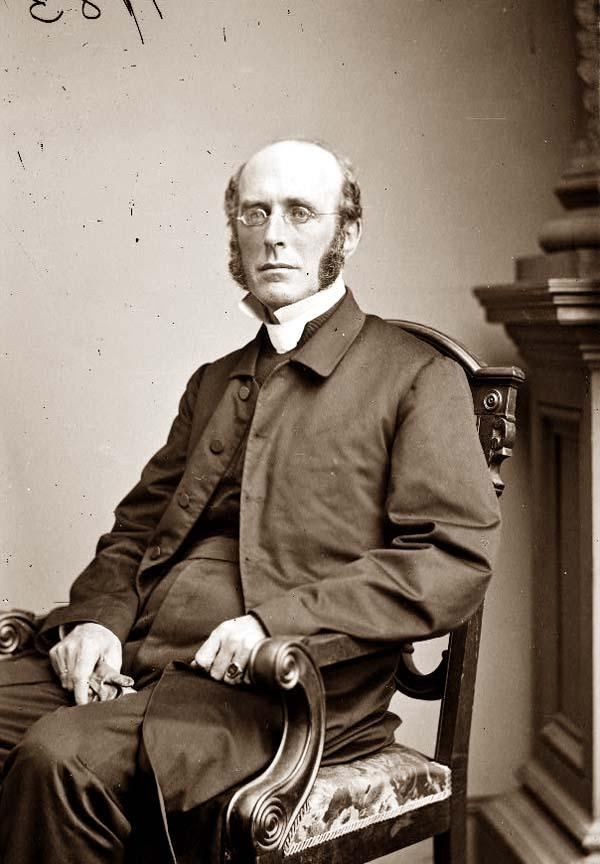
John Williams, Presiding Bishop of the Episcopal Church in the United States

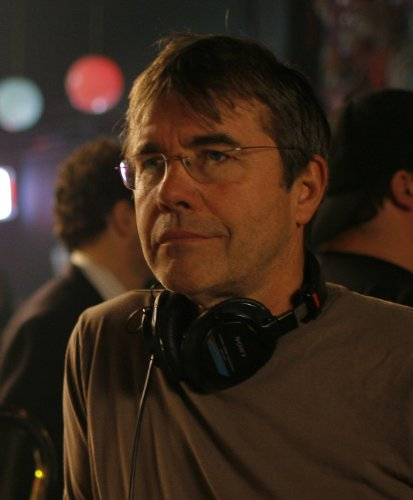
Stephen Gyllenhaal, film director

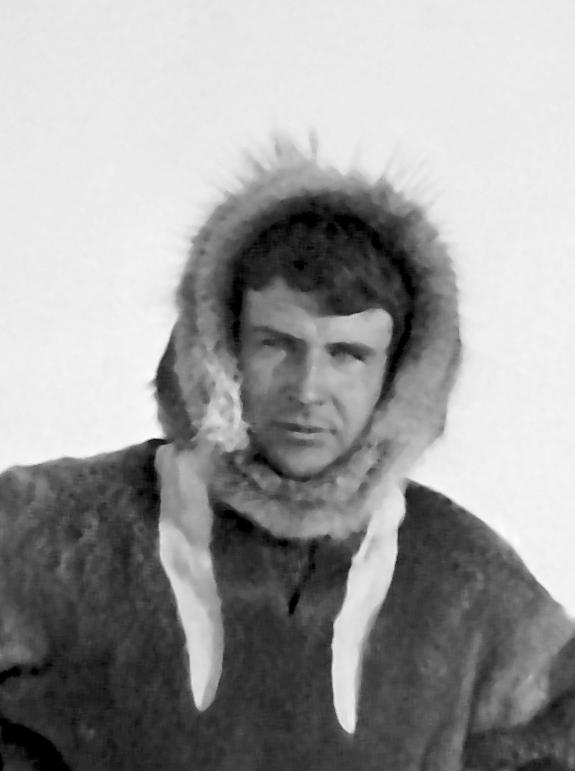
Ernest de Koven Leffingwell, geologist and Arctic explorer

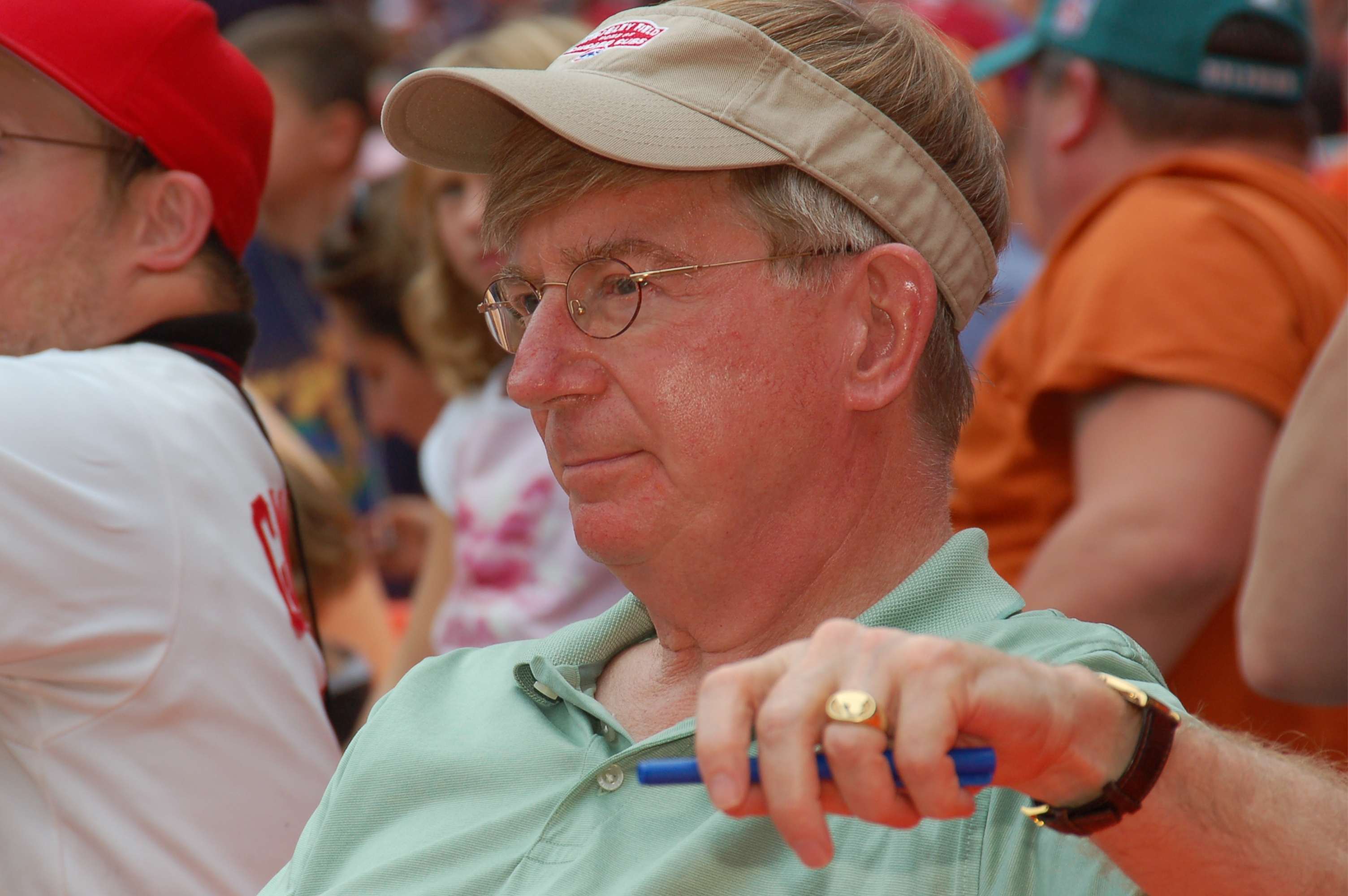
George Will, newspaper columnist, journalist, and author

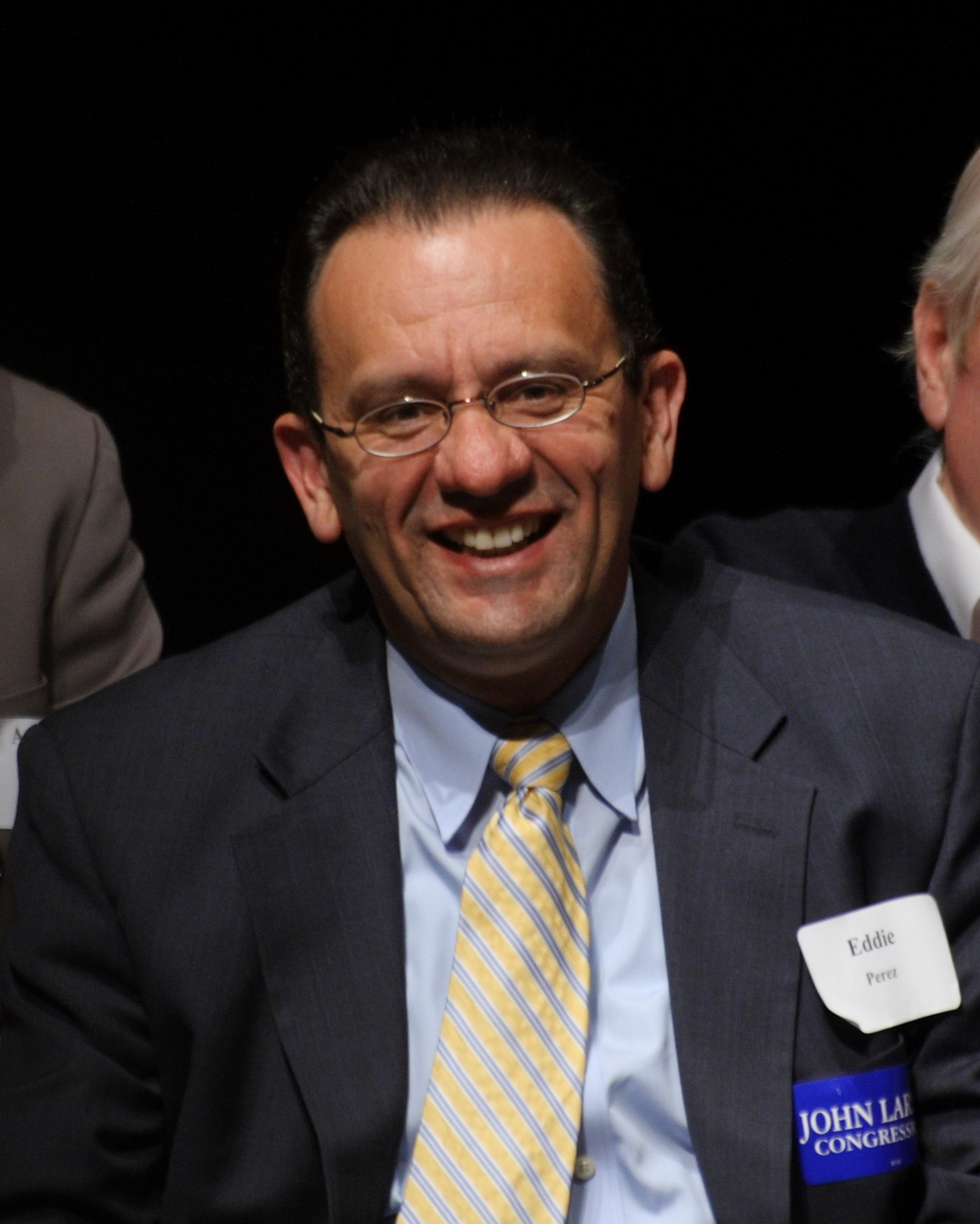
Eddie Pérez, former mayor of Hartford

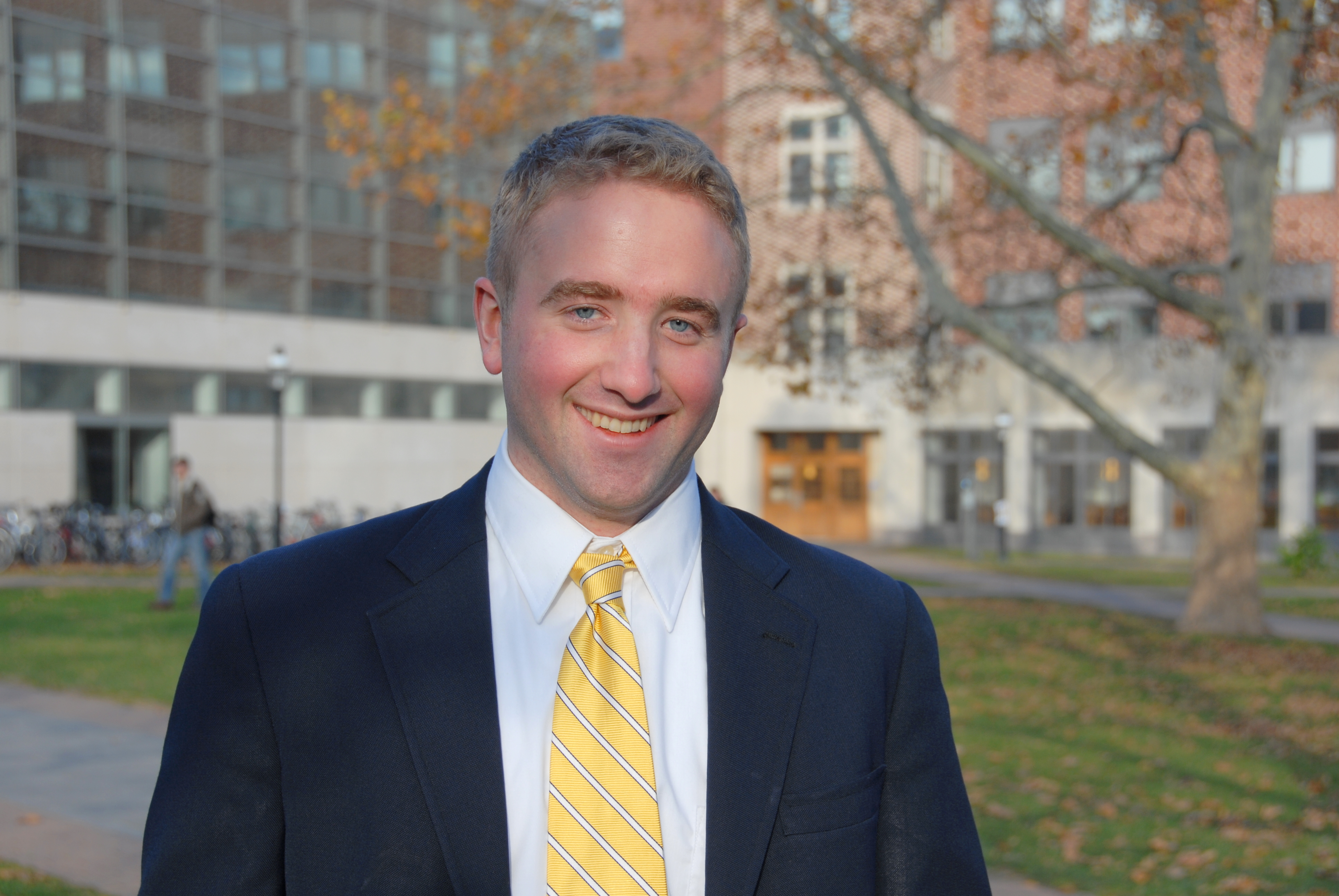
Bill Zeller, creator of Mytunes

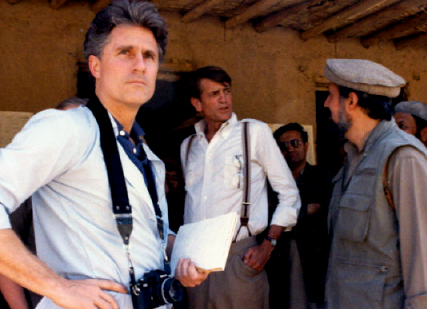
George Crile III with Charlie Wilson in Afghanistan

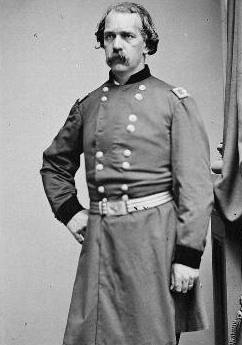
J. H. Hobart Ward, American Civil War general

== Notable graduates and attendees ==
=== Academia ===
- Charles McLean Andrews (1863–1943) was an American historian at Columbia University and Yale University professor whose "Colonial Period of American History, vol. 1 of 4," won him a Pulitzer Prize in 1935. He graduated from Trinity College, Hartford, in 1884 and received his Ph.D. from Johns Hopkins University in 1889.
- Jere Lehman Bacharach (1938–2023), was a distinguished American Islamic historian, University of Washington Professor Emeritus, 2009 Middle East Medievalists Lifetime Achievement Award recipient, and twice-named Samir Shama Fellow in Islamic Numismatics and Epigraphy, by Oxford University, in 2004 and 2005. He received his B.A. from Trinity College (CT), his M.A. from Harvard University, and his Ph.D. from the University of Michigan-Ann Arbor. He is author of Islamic History through Coins (AUC Press, 2006).
- Steven Barkan, sociologist and chairperson of the Sociology department at the University of Maine
- Anthony Beavers, professor of philosophy, director of cognitive science at the University of Evansville
- Lisa E. Bloom, cultural critic, educator and feminist art historian
- Harry McFarland Bracken, philosopher and author
- David R. Brown, former president of the Art Center College of Design
- John Collins Covell, educator, principal of the Virginia School for the Deaf and the Blind and West Virginia Schools for the Deaf and Blind
- Stephen Lloyd Cook, Professor of Old Testament Language and Literature at Virginia Theological Seminary
- Evan Dobelle, New England Board of Higher Education president and former Trinity president
- Louis Feldman, professor of classics and literature at Yeshiva University
- Jane Fernandes, former president designate of Gallaudet University
- Bruce Frier, John and Teresa D'Arms Distinguished University Professor of Classics and Roman Law, and Professor Emeritus of Classical Studies and of Law, University of Michigan
- Edward Miner Gallaudet, founder of Gallaudet University
- Tom Gerety, former Trinity president and president Amherst College 1994–2003, collegiate professor, New York University
- Michael Grossman, CUNY distinguished professor of economics and creator of the Grossman model in health economics
- Kenneth W. Harl, Tulane University professor, numismatist
- Walter Harrison, president of the University of Hartford and NCAA committee head
- Susannah Heschel, Dartmouth College's Eli Black professor of Jewish Studies
- J. C. Hurewitz, professor emeritus in the political science department at Columbia University
- Abner Jackson, minister and president of Trinity College and Hobart College
- Philip S. Khoury, vice provost and Ford International Professor of History, MIT
- Lloyd A. Lewis, theology professor at the Virginia Theological Seminary
- John H. Makin, economist and visiting scholar with the American Enterprise Institute
- Richard T. Nolan, philosophy and religion professor, writer, Episcopal Church Canon
- Phillips O'Brien, military historian
- Robert B. Pippin, philosopher; director of Department of Social Thought, University of Chicago
- Hyam Plutzik, Pulitzer Prize finalist, poet, and Professor of English at the University of Rochester
- William C. Richardson, board director of Exelon, former president of Johns Hopkins University, former director on the boards of the Kellogg Company, Bank of New York, CSX Corporation, and Mercantile Bankshares, former head of the Kellogg Foundation
- Franz Schurmann, sociologist and historian
- Jim Shepard, author and professor of creative writing and film at Williams College
- Robert B. Stepto, professor of English and African-American studies, Yale University
- George W. Strawbridge Jr., board member of Widener University (former adjunct professor), The Jockey Club, National Museum of Racing and Hall of Fame, National Steeplechase Association, Margaret Dorrance Strawbridge Foundation, Campbell Soup Co.
- Ilhi Synn, class of 1962, president of Keimyung University
- William G. Thomas III, history professor at the University of Nebraska–Lincoln, 2016 Guggenheim Fellow

=== Architecture ===
- J. Cleaveland Cady, architect, designer of the south range of the American Museum of Natural History in New York City
- Arthur Gilman, Boston architect
- William Harold Lee, movie theatre architect
- Benjamin Wistar Morris III, architect
- Samuel Beck Parkman Trowbridge, New York City architect

=== Arts and entertainment ===
- Peter Alsop, musician
- Arthur Everett Austin Jr., former director of the director of the Wadsworth Atheneum and Trinity professor
- Richard Barthelmess, silent film actor, a founder of the Academy of Motion Picture Arts and Sciences, 1928 Best Actor nominee
- John Biddle, cinematographer
- Deborah Buck, artist, designer and gallery owner
- Dudley Buck, composer
- Brian Byrne, mandolinist
- Max Coyer, artist
- Joseph Cross, actor
- Lesley Dill, artist
- Carroll Dunham, painter
- Jared Bradley Flagg, painter
- Gold Chains, electro rap musician
- Ari Graynor, actor
- Patrick Greene, composer
- Stephen Gyllenhaal, film producer and director
- Chris Hogan, comedian
- Christopher Houlihan, concert organist
- Mike Kellin, actor
- Mel Kendrick, artist
- Shahvaar Ali Khan, Pakistani writer, singer-songwriter and composer
- Dave MacKay, jazz pianist, singer-composer
- Mary McCormack, actor
- Will McCormack, actor
- Steven Newsome, arts administrator
- Katryna Nields, folk-rock musician
- Elizabeth Page, writer, director and filmmaker
- Joseph Payne, British/Swiss German harpsichordist, clavichordist, organist and musicologist
- Rachel Platten, singer and songwriter best known for her 2015 single "Fight Song"; won a Daytime Emmy Award
- Xavier Serbiá, member of the boy band Menudo, financial commentator and syndicated columnist
- Christopher Seufert, documentary film producer and director, and photographer
- Kwaku Sintim-Misa, Ghanaian actor and comedian
- Cotter Smith, stage, film, and television actor
- Ernie Stires, composer
- Allen Butler Talcott, landscape painter
- Richard Tuttle, postminimalist artist
- Ernst Vegelin, director of the Courtauld Gallery, London
- John Henry Willcox, organist
- Samuel Adams Wisner, rapper

=== Athletics ===
- Jonah Bayliss, Major League Baseball player
- Robert "Bob" Blum (born 1928), Olympic fencer
- George Brickley, former Major League Baseball and National Football League player
- Paul Collins, former National Football League player
- Eric DeCosta, executive vice president and general manager, Baltimore Ravens
- Dan Doyel, former Trinity men's basketball coach
- Moe Drabowsky, former Major League Baseball pitcher
- Kanzy Emad El Defrawy, squash player
- Peter Graves, Olympic rower
- Mickey Kobrosky, College Football Hall of Fame member, former NFL and MLB athlete
- Roger LeClerc, former National Football League player
- Bill MacDermott, professional football coach
- Jay Monahan, Class of 1993, commissioner of golf's PGA Tour
- Swede Nordstrom, football player
- Chuck Priore, former Trinity football coach
- Joe Shield, National Football League quarterback
- Aaron Westbrooks, Irish basketball player
- Jay Williamson, professional golfer, current member of the PGA Tour

=== Business and industry ===
- Hans W. Becherer, former president and CEO of John Deere
- S. Prestley Blake, co-founder of the Friendly Ice Cream Corporation
- David Chang, New York City chef and restaurateur, on the 2010 Time "100 Most Influential People" list
- Thomas M. Chappell, co-founder and CEO of Tom's of Maine
- Martin W. Clement, 11th president of the Pennsylvania Railroad
- William Pancoast Clyde, owner of the Clyde Steamship Company
- Robert Habersham Coleman, iron processing and railroad industrialist
- Thomas R. DiBenedetto, president of Boston International Group, owner of A.S. Roma and partner in New England Sports Ventures
- Elizabeth Elting, co-founder and co-CEO of TransPerfect
- Kristine Belson, president of Sony Pictures Animation and Oscar-nominated film producer (The Croods)
- Francis R. Delano, banker
- George M. Ferris, investment banker and philanthropist, founder of Ferris Baker Watts
- David Gottesman, billionaire, member of the board of directors of Berkshire Hathaway
- John D. Howard, CEO of Irving Place Capital
- Thomas S. Johnson, former chairman and CEO of GreenPoint Financial Corp
- Raymond E. Joslin, CEO of CAD Sciences, former president of Hearst Entertainment and Syndication, former senior vice president of the Hearst Corporation
- Sam Kennedy, president of the Boston Red Sox
- Alfred J. Koeppel (1932–2001), New York real estate developer
- Eileen Kraus (1938–2017), trailblazing woman banker and president of Connecticut National Bank
- Peter S. Kraus, CEO of AllianceBernstein and former co-head of the Investment Management Division at Goldman Sachs
- Mike Maccagnan, general manager for the New York Jets
- Mitchell M. Merin, former president and chief operating officer of Morgan Stanley Investment Management
- Danny Meyer, founder of Union Square Hospitality Group (Union Square Cafe, Gramercy Tavern, Eleven Madison Park, Tabla, Blue Smoke)
- James Murren, chairman of the board and chief executive officer of MGM Mirage
- Roy Nutt, founder of Computer Sciences Corporation and co-creator of FORTRAN
- Gunnar S. Overstrom Jr., former vice chair of FleetBoston Financial
- Charles R. Perrin, chairman of Warnaco, former chairman and CEO of Avon Products and former chairman and CEO of Duracell
- Michael J. Petrucelli, founder of Clearpath, Inc.
- Matthew Prince, co-founder and CEO of Cloudflare
- William C. Richardson, board director of Exelon; former president of Johns Hopkins University; former director on the boards of the Kellogg Company, the Bank of New York, CSX Corporation, and Mercantile Bankshares; former head of the Kellogg Foundation
- Thomas R. Savage, former CEO of American International Group
- Clarence D. Tuska, former director of patent operations of the Radio Corporation of America
- Camalia Valdés, president and CEO of Cerveceria India
- Roger L. Werner, director, president and chief executive officer of the Outdoors Channel Holdings, Inc.; former chief executive officer and the chief operating officer of ESPN

=== Government, law, and public policy ===
==== Elected officials ====
- John Baptista Ash, former U.S. representative for Tennessee
- William Shepperd Ashe, former U.S. representative
- Francisco L. Borges, former Connecticut State Treasurer
- Charles R. Chapman, former mayor of Hartford, Connecticut; served in both houses of the Connecticut legislature
- Percival W. Clement, 57th governor of Vermont
- William R. Cotter, U.S. representative for Connecticut
- Isaac E. Crary, first elected U.S. representative for Michigan
- Tilton E. Doolittle, Speaker of the Connecticut House of Representatives and Former United States Attorney for the District of Connecticut
- Bob Ebinger, member of the Montana House of Representatives
- Arie Eliav, Israeli member of the Knesset
- John H. Ewing, member of the New Jersey General Assembly and the New Jersey Senate
- Frank Fasi, former mayor of Honolulu
- John Fonfara, Connecticut state senator
- Rodney P. Frelinghuysen, U.S. representative for New Jersey
- Thomas L. Harris, former U.S. representative for Illinois
- Joan Hartley, Connecticut state senator
- Charles D. Hodges, former U.S. representative for Illinois
- Colin M. Ingersoll, former U.S. representative for Connecticut
- Barbara B. Kennelly, former U.S. representative
- Henry W. King, former politician from Ohio
- Robert L. King, former New York State Assemblyman, Monroe County executive, and chancellor of the State University of New York
- James Kinsella, former mayor of Hartford, Connecticut
- Themis Klarides, Class of 1987, Deputy Minority Leader of the Connecticut House of Representatives
- George Logan (Connecticut politician)
- Henry McBride, fourth governor of Washington State
- Thomas Joseph Meskill, former U.S. representative
- Robert F. Murphy, former Majority Leader of the Massachusetts House of Representatives and 59th lieutenant governor of Massachusetts
- William Anthony Paddon, former lieutenant governor of Newfoundland and Labrador
- Robert Treat Paine, U.S. representative for North Carolina
- Eddie Perez, former mayor of Hartford, CT
- James Phelps, former U.S. representative for Connecticut
- John S. Phelps, former governor of Missouri
- Christine C. Quinn, first female and first openly gay Speaker of the New York City Council
- Joseph F. Ryter, former U.S. representative
- Henry Joel Scudder, former U.S. representative
- Kevin Sullivan, former lieutenant governor of Connecticut and former vice president for community and institutional relations for Trinity
- Charles A. Sumner, former U.S. representative from California
- Jane Swift, Class of 1987, former acting governor of Massachusetts
- John T. Wait, former U.S. representative for Connecticut
- James Wakefield, former U.S. representative
- Joseph M. Warren, former U.S. representative for New York
- Charles C. Van Zandt, 34th governor of Rhode Island

==== Law ====
- George Bachrach, politician, attorney, and current professor at Boston University
- Joseph Buffington, judge, United States Court of Appeals for the Third Circuit
- Henry Campbell Black, the founder of Black's Law Dictionary, the definitive legal dictionary in the USA
- JoAnne A. Epps, law professor, legal author, Provost and 13th President of Temple University
- Bridget McCormack, chief justice of the Michigan Supreme Court
- Richard N. Palmer, associate justice of the Connecticut Supreme Court
- Thomas Richard Purnell, judge, United States District Court for the Eastern District of North Carolina
- Adam Streisand, trial lawyer
- Christine S. Vertefeuille, associate justice of the Connecticut Supreme Court

==== Other political figures ====
- Paul H. Alling, first United States Ambassador to Pakistan
- Michael A. Battle Sr., ambassador to the U.S. mission to the African Union
- Michael Billington, LaRouche Movement activist
- Roderick Allen DeArment, former chief of staff for senate majority leader Bob Dole and former United States Deputy Secretary of Labor
- Eugene H. Dooman, diplomat, drafted the Potsdam Declaration
- Steve Elmendorf, political chief of staff and deputy campaign manager
- J. Michael Farren, Deputy White House Counsel in the Office of Counsel to the President under the 43rd President of the United States George W. Bush
- Joan R. Kemler, the first woman to serve as Connecticut State Treasurer (1986–87)
- Jesse Lee, White House Director of Progressive Media & Online Response
- Nguyen Xuan Oanh, former governor of the State Bank of Vietnam, and former Prime Minister of the Republic of Vietnam
- Neil Patel, former chief policy advisor to Dick Cheney and co-founder of The Daily Caller
- Michael J. Petrucelli, deputy director and acting director of US Citizenship and Immigration Services at the US Department of Homeland Security
- Henry Shelton Sanford, diplomat and city founder
- Robert Tome, diplomat, physician, and writer
- Richard H. Walker, general counsel at Deutsche Bank and former director of the United States Securities and Exchange Commission Division of Enforcement
- Dov Zakheim, former government official and Trinity professor

=== Journalism and the media ===
- Jay Allison, independent public radio producer and broadcast journalist
- Bill Bird, journalist and publisher
- Tucker Carlson, commentator, former host of Tucker Carlson Tonight
- George Crile III, former CBS News journalist
- Anna David, author, journalist and television personality
- Jon Entine, author and Emmy winning special segment journalist with NBC News
- Eli Lake, national security correspondent for The Daily Beast and Newsweek Magazine
- Malcolm MacPherson, national and foreign correspondent for Newsweek magazine
- Colin McEnroe, columnist and radio personality
- Jim Murray, Pulitzer Prize–winning sportswriter for the Los Angeles Times
- David North, chairperson of the international editorial board of the World Socialist Web Site
- Steven Pearlstein, columnist for The Washington Post
- Robert William St. John, author, broadcaster and journalist
- David Sarasohn, columnist and managing editor of the Portland Oregonian, formerly a professor of US history at Reed College
- Caroline Taylor, actor and journalist
- Walter S. Trumbull, sportswriter
- Jesse Watters, Class of 2001, host of Watters' World and The Five; television producer; and on-air interviewer (Fox News)
- Linda Wells, founder and editor-in-chief at Allure magazine
- George Will, Pulitzer Prize-winning newspaper columnist, author, and ABC News political journalist
- Martyn Huw Williams, Welsh broadcaster and journalist

=== Literature and publishing ===
- Edward Albee, playwright, three-time Pulitzer Prize Winner (expelled, honorary degree, 1974)
- Stephen Belber, associate writer of the Laramie Project
- Park Benjamin Sr., poet and publisher
- Henry Howard Brownell, poet and historian.
- Michelle Cliff, poet and former Trinity professor
- Matthew Dicks, author
- Tom Doherty, publisher and founder of Tor Books, the largest publisher of science fiction and fantasy in the United States
- Richard Eberhart, poet and former Trinity professor
- Patrice Evans, author
- Patricia Fargnoli, poet
- Charles L. Grant, novelist and short story writer
- Ward Just, author
- James Longenbach, critic and poet
- George Malcolm-Smith, novelist and jazz musicologist
- Helen Curtin Moskey, poet
- Greg Potter, former comic book writer best known for co-creating the DC Comics series Jemm, Son of Saturn
- Tom Santopietro, best-selling author and Broadway theater manager
- Patricia Roth Schwartz, poet, playwright, and editor
- Joanna Scott, author and professor
- Parveen Shakir, poet and former Trinity professor
- Peter Swanson, author
- Chase Twichell, poet, professor, and publisher

=== Medicine ===
- Louis Aronne, physician, obesity specialist and author
- Robert Epstein, psychologist, researcher and writer
- James Hughes, bioethicist
- Mark Josephson, cardiologist and medical text writer
- James Ewing Mears, surgeon and former president of the American Surgical Association
- John S. Meyer, physician
- D. Holmes Morton, physician and Albert Schweitzer Prize for Humanitarianism recipient
- William Anthony Paddon, physician and lieutenant governor of Newfoundland 1981–1986
- Edward Hazen Parker, physician and poet
- Joseph O. Prewitt Díaz, psychologist
- Jeff Henderer, Chief of ophthalmology at Temple University School of Medicine
- David A. Weinstein, pediatric endocrinologist and Order of the Smile International Humanitarian award recipient

=== Military ===
- Donn F. Porter, Medal of Honor recipient
- Jon A. Reynolds, United States Air Force brigadier general and former Vietnam War prisoner of war
- Griffin Alexander Stedman, Union Army colonel in the U.S. Civil War
- Strong Vincent, Civil War soldier
- E. Donald Walsh, thirty-sixth adjutant general of the State of Connecticut
- J. H. Hobart Ward, American Civil War general
- James H. Ward, first officer of the United States Navy killed during the American Civil War
- George A. Woodward, brigadier general in the United States Army

=== Religion and theology ===
- James Roosevelt Bayley, archbishop
- Eben Edwards Beardsley, theologian and clergyman
- John W. Beckwith, second bishop of Georgia
- Clement Moore Butler, Episcopal clergyman who served as chaplain of the Chaplain of the United States Senate
- Edmond La Beaume Cherbonnier, professor and scholar, founder of Religion Department
- Arthur Cleveland Coxe, second Episcopal bishop of New York
- Robert Duncan, bishop
- Thomas Gallaudet, priest, pioneer of deaf education in the United States
- Alfred Harding, second Episcopal bishop of Washington
- Samuel Hart, Episcopal clergyman
- Francis L. Hawks, former priest and professor of divinity at Trinity
- Alexander Jolly, bishop of Moray, Ross and Caithness in the Scottish Episcopal Church
- David Buel Knickerbacker, third Protestant Episcopal bishop of the diocese of Indiana
- James A. Kowalski, current dean of the Cathedral of St. John the Divine
- Christie Macaluso, prelate of the Roman Catholic Church
- John James McCook, chaplain and theologian
- Ian A. McFarland, Lutheran theologian, 43rd Regius Professor of Divinity at the University of Cambridge
- John Mason Neale, Anglican divine and scholar
- William Woodruff Niles, A.B. 1857, professor of Latin, 1864–70, Episcopal Bishop of New Hampshire, 1870–1914
- Horatio Potter, bishop and former Trinity professor
- John E. Sanders, evangelical Christian theologian and free-will theist
- Henry Winter Syle, minister in the Episcopal Church
- Thomas Hubbard Vail, first Episcopal Bishop of Kansas
- Lemuel H. Wells, bishop
- John Williams, eleventh Presiding Bishop of the Episcopal Church in the United States

=== Science, mathematics, and engineering ===
- William Bowie, geodetic engineer
- March F. Chase, head of explosives division, War Industries Board
- Russell Doolittle, biochemist
- A. E. Douglass, astronomer who discovered a correlation between tree rings and the sunspot cycle
- Dean Hamer, chief of Gene Structure and Regulation, National Institutes of Health and discoverer of the controversial gay gene and God gene
- Eric Fossum, physicist and engineer
- Ernest de Koven Leffingwell, geologist and Arctic explorer
- Christian Sidor, biologist and paleontologist, curator of vertebrate paleontology in the Burke Museum of Natural History and Culture and Biology Professor at the University of Washington
- Ernest Henry Wilson, botanist
- Bill Zeller, computer programmer, creator of the MyTunes application

=== Other ===
- Harold Brooks-Baker, financier, journalist and publisher
- Verner Clapp, librarian
- Katharine Seymour Day, historic preservationist
- Foster Gunnison Jr., gay rights activist and archivist
- Caroline Hewins, first female graduate of Trinity College, librarian
- Charles J. Hoadly, Connecticut State Librarian from 1855 to 1900
- Kara Kennedy, daughter of U.S. Sen Edward M. Kennedy (transferred)
- Kelly Killoren Bensimon, author, jewelry designer and former editor of Elle Accessories
- Sally E. Pingree, philanthropist
- Isaac Toucey (former trustee at Trinity), former Secretary of the Navy, Attorney General of the United States and the 18th governor of Connecticut
- Alexander Trachtenberg, activist for the Socialist Party of America

== Faculty ==
- Paul Assaiante, men's squash and tennis coach
- Ciaran Berry, poet and professor of English
- Sarah Bilston, British author and professor of English literature
- Xiangming Chen, dean of the Center for Urban and Global Studies
- Edmond La Beaume Cherbonnier, Professor (Emeritus) of Religion
- Michelle Cliff, former professor of English
- George B. Cooper, former professor of history
- Leslie Desmangles, Charles A. Dana Research Professor of Religion and International Studies
- George Washington Doane, former professor of belles-lettres
- Richard Ebeling, former Shelby C. Davis Visiting Professor in American Economic History and Entrepreneurship
- Samuel Eliot, former Trinity president and professor
- William W. Ellsworth, former professor of law and 30th governor of Connecticut
- Michael C. FitzGerald, professor of fine arts
- Rebecca Goldstein, former philosophy professor
- Robert Hillyer, poet and former professor of English
- James J. Hughes, sociologist and bioethicist teaching health policy
- Drew Hyland, professor of philosophy at Trinity
- Mark Jackson, former director of football for the Oakland Raiders and former assistant football coach at Trinity
- Gary Jacobson, former professor of political science
- James F. Jones, president of Trinity College
- Samuel Kassow, Jewish history professor and historian
- Charles Lemert, social theorist and sociologist, visiting professor of sociology
- Michael Lerner, former professor of philosophy
- Reinhard H. Luthin, visiting professor of history
- Elmer Truesdell Merrill, Latin scholar and former Trinity professor
- Stephen Minot, novelist and short story author
- Frank Gardner Moore, Latin scholar and former Trinity professor
- Okey Ndibe, professor of English teaching fiction and African literature
- Jon O. Newman, United States federal judge and former instructor at Trinity College
- Hugh Ogden, poet and former professor of creative writing
- Stewart O'Nan, former writer-in-residence and professor of English
- Robert Bromley Oxnam, former professor of Asian history and former president of the Asia Society
- Gregory Anthony Perdicaris, former Ancient Greek professor and first U.S Consul to Greece
- Fred Pfeil, former English professor and literary critic
- Vijay Prashad, George and Martha Kellner Chair in South Asian History and professor of international studies
- Steven Pressman, former professor of economics
- David Rosen, literary scholar, recipient of the 2013 James Russell Lowell Prize from the MLA
- Barry R. Schaller, visiting lecturer in public policy
- Odell Shepard, former professor of English and lieutenant governor of Connecticut
- Mark Silk, professor of religious studies, author
- Edward Stringham, associate professor of American business and economic enterprise
- Clarence Watters, chapel organist and head of the music department

== Presidents of the college ==
- Daniel Lugo 2025–Present - 23rd president
- Joanne Berger-Sweeney 2014–2025 - 22nd president
- James Fleming Jones Jr. 2004–2014 - 21st president
- Borden Winslow Painter Jr. '58, H'95 2003–2004 - 20th president
- Richard H. Hersh 2002–2003 - 19th president
- Ronald R. Thomas H'02 - acting president 2001–2002
- Evan Samuel Dobelle H'01 1995–2001 - 18th president
- Borden Winslow Painter Jr. '58, H'95 - acting president 1994–1995
- Tom Gerety 1989–1994 - 17th president
- James Fairfield English Jr. H'89 1981–1989 - 16th president
- Theodore Davidge Lockwood '48, H'81 1968–1981 - 15th president
- Albert Charles Jacobs H'68 1953–1968 - 14th president
- George Keith Funston 1945–1951 - 13th president
- Authur Howard Hughes M'38, H'46 - acting president 1943–1945, 1951–1953
- Remsen Brinckerhoff Ogilby 1920–1943 - 12th president
- Henry Augustus Perkins - acting president 1915–1916, 1919–1920
- Flavel Sweeten Luther '70, H'04 1904–1919 - 11th president
- George Williamson Smith H'87 1883–1904 - 10th president
- Thomas Ruggles Pynchon '41 1874–1883 - 9th president
- John Brocklesby, acting president 1874
- Abner Jackson '37 1867–1874 - 8th president
- John Brocklesby, acting president 1866–1867
- John Barrett Kerfoot H'65 1864–1866 - 7th president
- Samuel Eliot H'57 1860–1864 - 6th president
- Daniel Raynes Goodwin 1853–1860 - 5th president
- John Williams '35 1848–1853 - 4th president
- Silas Totten 1837–1848 - 3rd president
- Nathaniel Sheldon Wheaton 1831–1837 - 2nd president
- Thomas Church Brownell 1824–1831 - 1st president
