= Edward Parker =

Edward or Eddie Parker may refer to:

- Edward Parker, 12th Baron Morley (1550–1618), English peer
- Edward Parker (cricketer) (born 1939), Zimbabwean cricketer
- Edward Griffin Parker (1825–1868), United States lawyer, editor and author
- Edward Harper Parker (1849–1926), English Chinese scholar
- Edward Hazen Parker (1823–1896), American physician and poet
- Edward Lutwyche Parker (1785–1850), United States (Londonderry, N.H.) Presbyterian clergyman
- Edward M. Parker (1855–1925), bishop of the Episcopal Church in the United States
- Edward N. Parker (1904–1989), American admiral
- Edward Stone Parker (1802–1865), Methodist preacher and assistant Protector of Aborigines
- Eddie Parker (actor) (1900–1960), stuntman and actor
- Eddie Parker (musician) (born 1959), English jazz flautist and composer
- Eddie Parker (pool player) (c. 1932–2001), American pool player
- Eddie Parker, character in Inheritance (2020 film)
- Eddie Parker, victim in the 2023 Rankin County torture incident
- Edward Parker (runner), American steeplechaser, runner-up at the 1929 USA Outdoor Track and Field Championships
- Ted Parker (footballer) (1903–1929), Australian rules footballer

== See also ==
- Ned Parker, fictional character in Neighbours
- Ed Parker (1931–1990), American martial artist
