= Bouckaert =

Bouckaert is a surname. Notable people with the surname include:

- Boudewijn Bouckaert (born 1947), a Belgian law professor, a member of the Flemish Movement and a conservative politician
- Carl Bouckaert (born 1954), a Belgian equestrian and businessman
- Daniel Bouckaert (1894–1965), a Belgian vaulter who competed in the 1920 Summer Olympics
- Harm Bouckaert (born 1934), an art dealer, gallerist, and major figure in the 1980s art scene in New York
- Henri Bouckaert (1870–1912), a French competition rower and Olympic champion
- Jente Bouckaert (born 1990), a Belgian athlete who competes in the sprint
- Peter Bouckaert (activist) (born 1970), Belgian human rights activist
