= Joseph Cassano =

American businessman

Joseph J. "Joe" Cassano (born 12 March 1955) is an American insurance executive who was an officer at AIG Financial Products from the division's founding in 1987 until his resignation in February 2008. Cassano is considered a key figure in the 2008 financial crisis.

His employees characterized him as a "bully", and said that the culture of fear helped to create the downfall of AIG, as Cassano would often yell at employees who tried to warn him about the dangers of subprime bonds. AIG later suffered a $99 billion loss and got bailed out by the U.S. government. Political writer Matt Taibbi nicknamed him "Patient Zero of the global economic meltdown."

== Work at AIG ==
In 1987, AIG hired Cassano as one of the first ten people in the Financial Products unit, as Chief Financial Officer. In 1994, Thomas R. Savage appointed Cassano as head of the Transaction Development Group. Cassano accepted the 1998 proposal by J.P. Morgan to package credit default swaps (CDS) on Broad Index Secured Trust Offering (nicknamed Bistros). Cassano considered these collateralized debt obligations a key event: "It was a watershed event in 1998 when J.P. Morgan came to us, who were somebody we worked with a great deal, and asked us to participate."

=== Subprime mortgage crisis ===
Cassano sold hundreds of billions of credit protection in the form of CDSs without having to put up any real money as collateral as this form of insurance had been deregulated with the Phil Gramm-sponsored Commodity Futures Modernization Act of 2000, signed by Bill Clinton. When, in the 2008 financial crisis, investment banks requested insurance money for their collapsing derivatives, AIG was unable to deliver and received a bail-out from the taxpayers. Just one year earlier while discussing the company's CDS portfolio with analysts, he said "It is hard for us, and without being flippant, to even see a scenario within any realm of reason that would see us losing $1 in any of those transactions."

During his career at AIGFP from 1987 until he was forced to retire in March 2008, Cassano received $315 million: $280 million in cash and an additional $34 million in bonuses. An initial $1 million-a-month consulting fee was later canceled. According to Matt Taibbi:

In fact, Cassano remained on the payroll and kept collecting his monthly million through the end of September 2008, even after taxpayers had been forced to hand AIG $85 billion to patch up his mistakes. When asked in October why the company still retained Cassano at his $1 million-a-month rate despite his role in the probable downfall of Western civilization, CEO Martin Sullivan told Congress with a straight face that AIG wanted to "retain the 20-year knowledge that Mr. Cassano had." (Cassano, who is apparently hiding out in his lavish town house near Harrods in London, could not be reached for comment.)

In the wake of the scandal, United States regulators and the United Kingdom Serious Fraud Office began investigating Cassano's dealings to determine whether they were just excessive and risky, or criminal.

A two-year investigation by the U.S. Department of Justice ended in May 2010 with no criminal charges brought against Cassano, who was represented by lawyers Jim Walden and F. Joseph Warin of Gibson, Dunn & Crutcher.

== Political contributions ==
Cassano was a political contributor to the campaigns of Democratic Senators Chris Dodd and Barack Obama and the Republican Representative Nancy L. Johnson.

In March 2009 Cassano was linked to e-mails he authored in 2006 which solicited contributions from AIG executives for Dodd's campaign due to Dodd's position as incoming chairman of the Senate Banking Committee.

== Early life ==
Cassano grew up in Brooklyn, New York, where his father was a policeman. He earned a political science degree from Brooklyn College in 1977. He worked in the back office at investment bank Drexel Burnham Lambert during their junk bond phase.
