= Homelessness in Ohio =

Homelessness in Ohio has increased in recent years. In 2024, the state experienced a 3% rise in the homeless population, with certain areas having a larger increase. For example: Columbus and Franklin County reported a 7.4% increase in 2025. All three major cities in Ohio saw increases in homelessness in 2023, in part due to housing shortages. Recent reports have ranked Ohio among the top 10 states with the largest total homeless populations, and a 2023 analysis similarly identified it as having a high number of people experiencing homelessness.

Despite the high total numbers, Ohio's per capita homelessness rate remains closer to the national average. In 2024, the rate was estimated at 9.66 per 10,000 residents, compared to the national rate of 22.7 per 10,000.

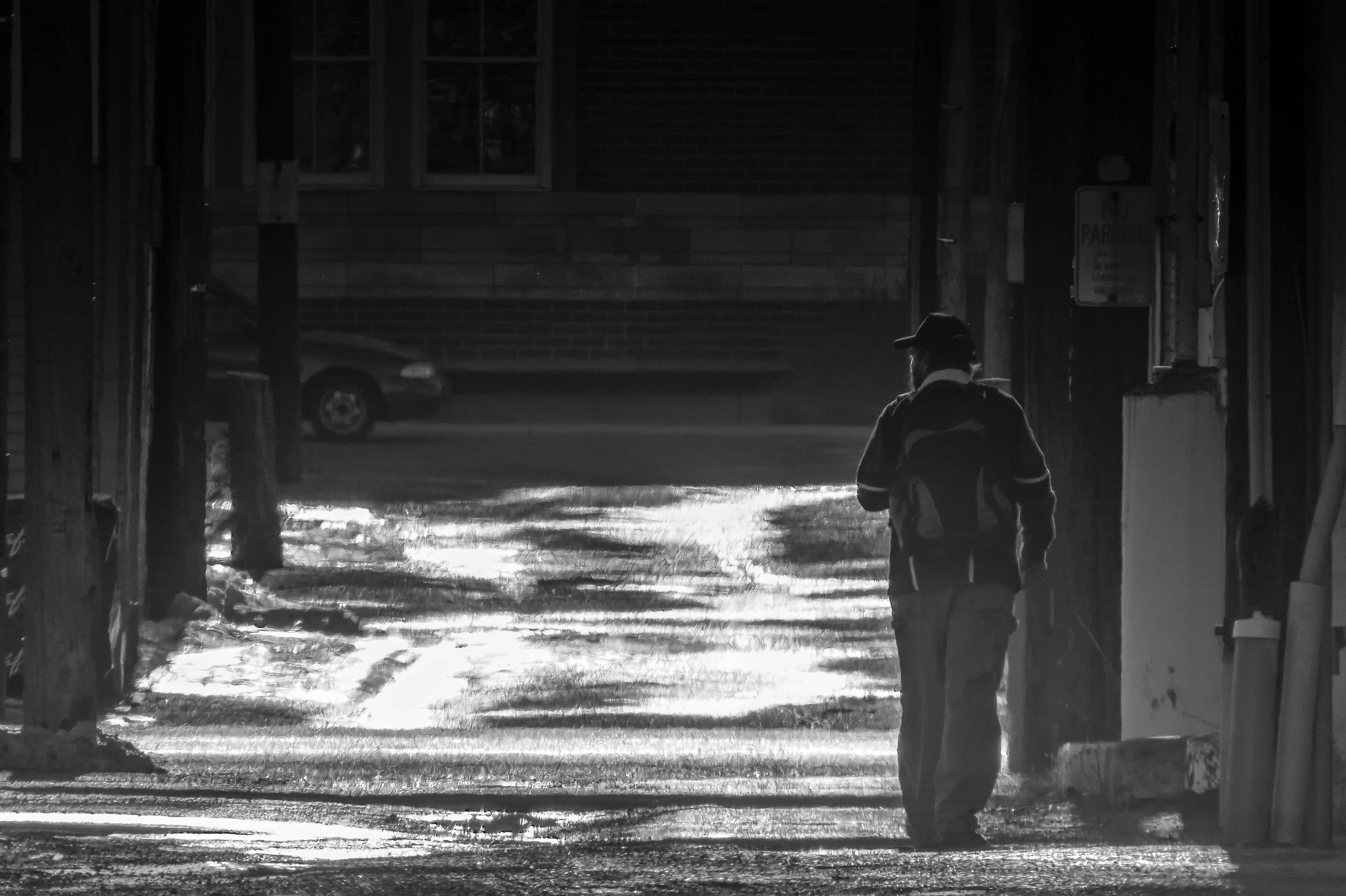
A man walking down alley in Newark, Ohio

The 2022 Annual Homelessness Assessment Report (AHAR) from the U.S. Department of Housing and Urban Development estimated that 10,654 Ohioans experienced homelessness that year, with over 80% being sheltered. This group included 3,214 people in families with children, 703 unaccompanied youth, 633 veterans, and 1,023 chronically homeless individuals. Although the statewide rate had remained relatively stable in prior years, the 2022 population still represented a 5.4% decrease from 2007. Since 2007, Ohio also saw the fourth-largest decrease in chronic homelessness among states, with 1,285 individuals or 55.7% of that group exiting chronic homelessness during that time.

In contrast to national stereotypes, a 1986 study of nearly 1,000 homeless individuals in Ohio found that many had strong local ties: 65% had lived in the same county for at least a year or were born there, and 87% had previously held a job. A quarter of those surveyed were employed at the time of the study.

== Possible causes ==
=== Housing ===
The Ohio housing situation is facing a crisis, with housing costs increasing dramatically and availability declining. Government census data estimates that population growth (1.74%) has outpaced the increase in housing units (1.66%) over the last five years. For low-income families, affordable housing has been difficult to find, as for every 100 low-income households, only 80 affordable units exist. Furthermore, the median price for a house in 2019 was 2.4 times the median household income, pushing home ownership out of reach even for middle-income individuals. The quality of housing has also been declining: 50% of houses in Ohio were built before 1965, and 30% of available housing was built before 1940. In 2015, an estimated 4% of Ohioans lived in a house that was deemed structurally inadequate, representing over 200,000 housing units.

Corporations are putting additional stress on the housing market, as these companies are purchasing an increasing number of Ohio homes to rent out for profit. In 2021, institutional investors were responsible for 16% of the home buyer market, the sixth highest rate in the country. Ohio Senator Louis Blessing warned in June 2023 that, by 2040, 40-50% of homes could be owned by corporations. This sudden reduction in home ownership and driving up prices has led to the loss of billions of dollars in the state's wealth, disproportionately affecting low-income individuals.

A 2022 study concluded that this housing shortage was likely underestimated, as study methodologies considered the number of houses that would have been built following historical trends, failing to account for supply and demand constraints that affected those rates. Thus, the housing shortage may be more significant than the data appears to show.

== Support ==
=== Youth ===
As of 2019, around 35,000 students struggled with homelessness at various points during the school year. This included 374 unsheltered youth, 5,209 sheltered students, nearly 2,000 living in hotels or motels, and over 25,000 with shared living agreements. This was partially attributed in a 2022 study to an increase in housing costs coupled with low construction and vacancy.

The McKinney-Vento Law was designed to support homeless youth in Ohio. The law gives students the right to enrollment, transportation, and support, among other anti-homeless guidance. The American Rescue Plan Act of 2021 provided additional funds for students, with Ohio receiving nearly $30 million. This money went to 30 different school districts to serve as a short-term solution in the wake of the COVID-19 pandemic.

== Anti-homelessness Legislation ==
=== Background ===
Anti-homelessness legislation refers to laws and ordinances that restrict where people experiencing homelessness can sleep, camp, or store personal belongings in public spaces. In recent years, the number of these laws has been increasingly growing across the United States as cities struggle to manage visible homelessness and encampments. Supporters argue that such measures protect public safety and sanitation, while critics say they criminalize poverty and fail to address the root causes of homelessness. In Ohio, this national trend has gained momentum following the Grants Pass v. Johnson Supreme Court decision, which expanded local governments’ authority to regulate public spaces.

Grants Pass vs. Johnson

Homelessness has increased nationally following the Supreme Court’s June 28, 2024, ruling in Grants Pass v. Johnson, which allowed individual state and regional governments to pass laws banning citizens from sleeping in outdoor spaces. The court case took place on June 28, 2024 and involved an agreement that by enforcing a ban, the Constitutional rights of homeless individuals are not violated. The majority opinion, written by Justice Neil M. Gorsuch, emphasized that the ruling did not make homelessness criminal, but aimed to give state governments the power to manage public spaces in the way they want. Following the decision, many states across the nation began drafting laws that included fines and jail time for those caught with violations. In Ohio, many cities have acted upon this law as an opportunity to implement sleeping bans on public property. Cities such as Newark, New Philadelphia, and Findlay, have passed camping bans, making it illegal to sleep or camp on city-owned grounds, parks, or sidewalks. If citizens are caught breaking these laws, new ordinances state that they can be fined, or even face possible jail time if they have multiple offenses.

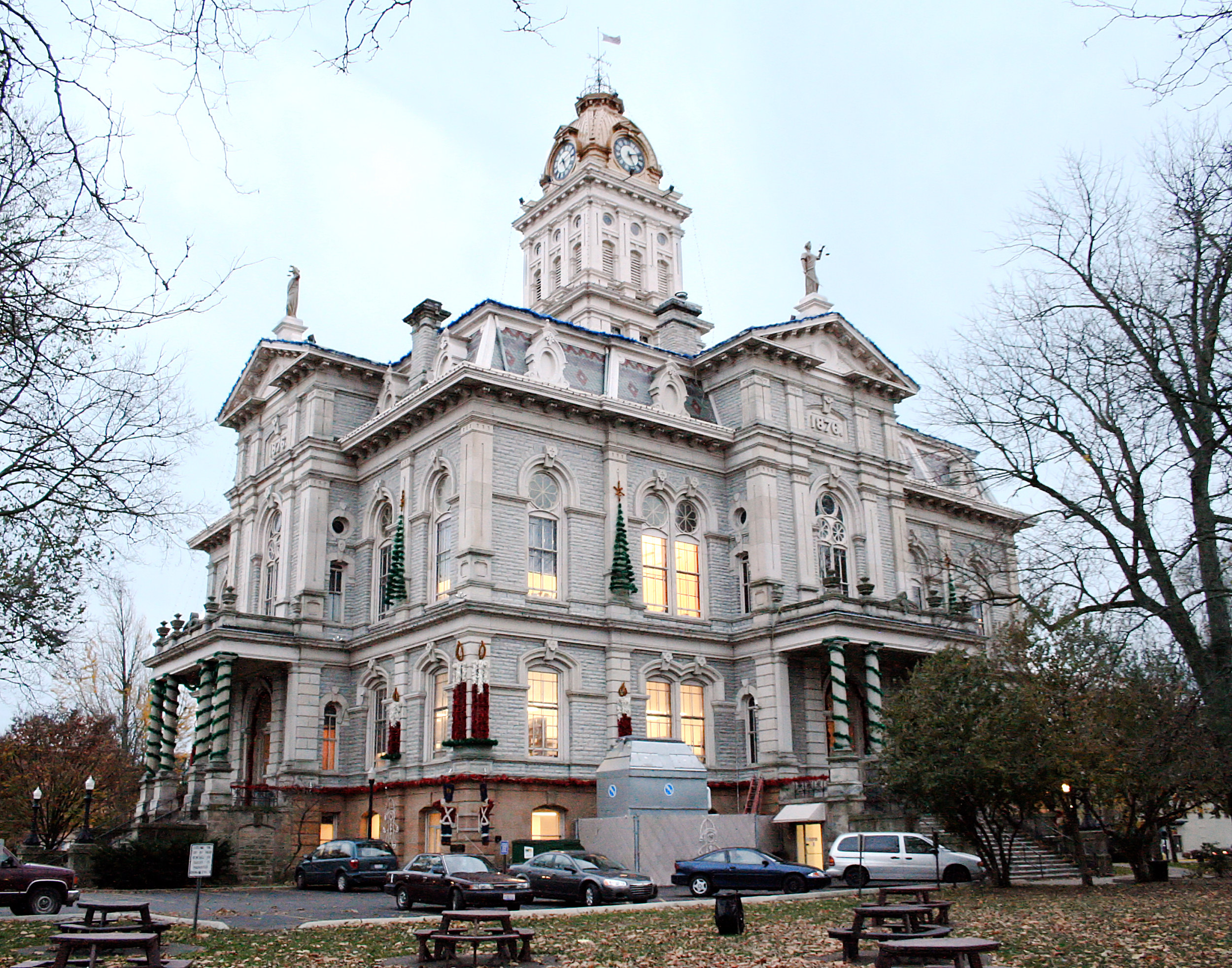
Newark City Hall, where the HOME Court initiative was passed by the Newark City Council to address homelessness through alternative sentencing programs.

Municipal Responses to Homelessness

These laws have received both criticism and support from the community. The people in favor of these bans argue that they are maintaining public safety and cleanliness. Critics feel that these laws criminalize homelessness and target the poor. The Grants Pass v. Johnson decision has created a patchwork of local responses across Ohio, as each city interprets and enforces anti-homelessness laws differently. The Law of Grants Pass v. Johnson allows cities across Ohio to handle anti-homelessness legislation in different ways. Some cities have taken a more enforcement-centered approach, while others have paired new laws with outreach or support initiatives.

In Newark, for instance, city leaders have decided to balance enforcement with assistance programs. Newark, has created a specialized HOME Court that stands for Housing Opportunities through Municipal Engagement. The role of the Court is to provide an alternative to jail or fines for those that are caught breaking sleeping ordinances or camping ban laws. The effort of HOME Court is to deal with Homelessness in a humane manner. The Court aims to provide support, housing resources, health care, and action plans to the people of Newark. While HOME Court has shown positive signs of impact for those affected by new legislation, concerns still remain that new issues will arise with a lack of affordable housing in the community.

In Findlay, another city in Ohio, a new historic record of over 200 people have been reported as unsheltered. The city council strives to reduce visible homelessness and connect struggling people to shelters. In an attempt to make this possible, Findlay formed an “unhoused coalition” as a solution to find shelter. Mayor Christina Muryn emphasizes that in order to be fair, law enforcement will issue warnings and a grace period before legal action is taken.

Police and other law officials share the perspective that encampments in the past have led to an increase in crime, drug use, and unsanitary conditions in public areas. The bans provide an opportunity to address community concerns about the cleanliness and accessibility of parks, sidewalks, and other public spaces. Some law enforcement officials report that encampment clearances have led more individuals to accept available services or seek temporary shelter. The supporters of sleeping and camping bans argue that the laws protect both the homeless and residents of a city, despite the strict laws.

Many residents have shared their voice with strong concerns about the visible effects of homeless encampments in their neighborhoods. They have reported experiences of elevated public-safety risks, including increased drug use, open disposal of human waste, and greater exposure to unsanitary conditions. However, some residents are frustrated about these approaches. Many residents support policies that ban camping in public parks or roads, seeing them as necessary to restore accessibility, cleanliness, and safety for all but they also call for assurances that the homeless are offered meaningful alternatives rather than simply being moved along.

Advocacy groups argue that these laws fail because they do not address the significant issues of homelessness involving affordable housing and job opportunities. Data shows the fines and charges that have occurred since the passing of sleeping bans, have made it harder for the homeless to recover and find housing in the future. Critics argue that it would be more beneficial to focus on long term solutions rather than punishments.

Political Context

The Trump Administration has viewed homelessness as a public safety issue. The administration has shifted away from the Housing First approach and providing affordable housing to a new model that prioritizes public safety. This is a significant policy reversal from earlier federal strategies that emphasized housing stability as a foundation for recovery and reintegration.

Following the Grants Pass v. Johnson ruling, national leaders also began handling homelessness in different positions. This decision gave political leaders more of a justification to frame homelessness as a matter of law enforcement rather than social welfare. In July 2025, President Trump passed an executive order titled Ending Crime And Disorder On America’s Streets. The purpose of the order was to direct federal and local authorities to remove homeless encampments and relocate individuals to mental health or substance use treatment centers. Trump passed this law with the intent to keep public areas clean, while also connecting people to help. Supporters of the order claim it balances public safety with access to services, while those in opposition to Trump's order argue it contradicts the Housing First approach, adopted during the George W. Bush Administration, to focus on housing without any prerequisites. Housing First, was put in place to provide stable housing prior to forcing treatment or job opportunities. Several studies show that affordable housing is much more effective than other approaches that criminalize homelessness.

According to Trump, individuals who are found guilty of violating these bans will be arrested, but they will also be given the option to accept resources if they are willing to be rehabilitated. Additionally Trump, said he will be working with states to ban urban camping and make an effort to get people into treatment for drug addiction and mental health. According to a study cities can adopt alternative first response programs, this would include sending health clinicians, peers, social workers and other professionals instead of the police.

=== Anti-Homelessness Laws and Ordinances in Ohio ===
Local governments in Ohio have been given the right to enforce fines, arrests, and imprisonment for people sleeping in public places. After the US Supreme Court’s City of Grants passed Pass v. Johnson, over 150 cities in approximately 32 states implemented or expanded bans on outdoor camping, even in areas where shelters may not have enough capacity. Based on data sent to Stateline by the National Homelessness Law Center, some other local bans include prohibitions of sleeping or storing property on public land. According to some housing advocates and experts, the camping bans seem to continue in 2025 because some residents are scared of homeless encampments, which consequently criminalize visible homelessness.

As of December 2024, the Ohio cities that have enacted legislation regarding Homeless Encampment Bans include: Wilmington, Newark, New Philadelphia, Brunswick, Heath, Mentor, and Ashtabula. While the cities of Chillicothe, Marietta, and Belpre are considering enacting an ordinance.

In the cities of Newark and Heath, a first offense would be viewed as a misdemeanor, and any individual considered guilty could have to pay a fine of up to $150. Following that, any violation - such as doing the same offense for a second or third time - would be viewed as a fourth-degree misdemeanor, which is punishable by up to 30 days in jail and $250 worth of fines. These penalties vary by city but overall reflect a trend towards treating repeated camping or sleeping violations as criminal offenses rather than civil infractions.

=== Impact of Anti-homelessness Laws and Ordinances ===
==== Rates of Homelessness ====
Research indicates that criminalizing homelessness can make it more difficult for individuals to secure jobs and housing, reinforcing the cycle of poverty. Arrest records, fines, and displacement from encampments can hinder access to employment, services, and identification documents. Furthermore, these kinds of policies can continue the cycle of homelessness rather than resolve it. Research has also shown that banning urban camping will affect the public safety for everyone. Displacement caused by enforcement efforts may increase the likelihood of contact with the criminal justice system, as individuals are moved from one area to another without stable shelter options. There has been a direct correlation between homelessness and incarceration. This may suggest that laws criminalizing homelessness may be linked to broader public safety and criminal justice outcomes.

Physical Health of Unhoused Individuals

Frequent displacement from public spaces can worsen physical health outcomes. There is evidence to prove that with improper sanitation and ventilation communicable diseases are spread much easier. Individuals are opting to not sleep in shelters due to overcrowding and poor conditions. These shelter environments are promoting the spread of transmissible diseases like: tuberculosis. The risk of contracting a foodborne illness is even greater due to the lack of sanitation. Additionally stricter enforcement policies have led some individuals to seek more remote or hidden areas for rest, which makes it harder for outreach workers to provide health services or sanitation supplies. As a result, access to health services, food and sanitation may become more limited increasing public concerns.

Mental Health of Marginalized Groups

Marginalized groups are more likely to be affected. Since the passing of Grants Pass v. Johnson some populations, including LGBTQ youth and racial minorities, remain disproportionately impacted by homelessness and related policies. According to national data, about 28% report ever having experienced homelessness or housing instability. Additionally their mental health is at great risk, a survey found that 35% of LGBTQ youth who have experienced homelessness have attempted suicide within the year and 62% stated they have seriously considered suicide. These surveys may indicate that homelessness may impact certain populations at higher rates.

=== Advocacy and Alternatives ===
Many advocacy groups have taken action against anti-homelessness laws in Ohio. The Coalition on Homelessness and Housing in Ohio (COHHIO) has argued that these bans are acting as punishment for homelessness rather than solving the issue. Activists are fighting for affordable housing, support, and job programs. Groups such as COHHIO have attended city council meetings, organized protests, and challenged legal bans while trying to encourage better systems.

In some cities such as Newark, the HOME Court has worked to provide meals, shelter, and services to those that have been displaced by camping bans. The main purpose of these advocacy groups is to provide support and encouragement, rather than police enforcement.

In Cleveland, due to an initiative launched at the start of 2025 titled A Home For Every Neighbor, more than 150 people without any shelter have been able to find stable housing. According to COHHIO and the National Low Income Housing Coalition, in order to afford a two-bedroom apartment, residents in Ohio need to make at least $22.51 an hour as a full-time job. As a result, investments have been made in housing to fight against homelessness.

== Major cities ==
=== Columbus ===
Columbus has been facing a significant homelessness issue, trending in the opposite direction of the overall state. The homeless population totaled 2,036 in 2019. This reflected roughly a 7% increase from 2018, including a 17.5% decrease in the sheltered homeless population. Columbus' homeless population is made up of 35.3% of families with children and 3.7% of homeless youth.

In 2018, the Columbus City Council passed ordinance 1777–2018, a measure aimed to find an alternative way to curb panhandling in the face of the Supreme Court's Reed v. Town of Gilbert ruling. This ordinance, while not banning panhandling, made it illegal to distribute money in the roadway, stand near someone operating an ATM, and attempt to initiate distribution by touching or grabbing somebody. Councilmember Mitchell J. Brown described it as "not an attack on poverty or homelessness, but a measure to provide protections for those who give and those who receive".

=== Cleveland ===
In 2017, around 23,000 people in Cuyahoga County (where Cleveland is located) faced homelessness, with Cleveland Public School District being home to nearly 2,750 homeless students. This is compounded by the fact that Cuyahoga County has seen the number of sheltered beds drop by 444 and a waitlist of over 21,000.

To address this problem, Cuyahoga County's Department of Health and Human Services released a four-year action plan in January 2023. This plan seeks to decrease the homeless population in the county by 25%. Some of the steps outlined include improving accessibility to homelessness prevention services, short-term shelters, more affordable housing, and bolstering the department's resources.

In 2017, Cleveland repealed its anti-panhandling laws. Faced with a lawsuit from the American Civil Liberties Union on behalf of John Mancini, a US veteran, the city repealed laws against panhandling. The city council also significantly reformed laws restricting pedestrians near roadways, removing any language referring to panhandling specifically.

=== Cincinnati ===
In 2021, Cincinnati had a total of 6,062 homeless individuals, representing a 14% reduction since 2019. This population housed in emergency shelters dropped by 16% since 2019, to 5,603 individuals. There has been a 10% drop in the unsheltered homeless population since 2020 and a 46% decrease since 2013. Of this homeless population, 23%, or 1,381 are children.

The city in June 2023 allocated a $2.1 million grant for the Human Services Fund, a company that plans to use data analytics to identify and address patterns in the Cincinnati homeless population. In addition, the organization will work with landlords across the city to improve accessibility to affordable housing.

Cincinnati's City Ordinance 910-12 outlines circumstances in which panhandling is banned, including soliciting from individuals on public transportation, within 20 feet of any financial institution or ATM, on private property, and from those getting into their vehicles. Violating this ordinance is a fourth-degree misdemeanor, which is bumped up to third-degree after three violations.

== See also ==
- Homelessness in the United States by state
