= Reed v. Town of Gilbert =

- Supreme Court of the United States

Argued January 12, 2015 Decided June 18, 2015
- Full case name: Clyde Reed, et al., Petitioners v. Town of Gilbert, Arizona, et al.
- Docket no.: 13-502
- Citations: 576 U.S. 155 (more) 135 S. Ct. 2218; 192 L. Ed. 2d 236; 2015 U.S. LEXIS 4061; 83 U.S.L.W. 4444; 25 Fla. L. Weekly Fed. S 383
- Argument: Oral argument

Case history
- Prior: On Writ of Certiorari to the United States Court of Appeals for the Ninth Circuit, Reed v. Town of Gilbert, 707 F.3d 1057 (9th Cir. 2013)

Holding
- A municipal ordinance that placed stricter limitations on the size and placement of religious signs than other types of signs was an unconstitutional content-based restriction on free speech.

Court membership
- Chief Justice John Roberts Associate Justices Antonin Scalia · Anthony Kennedy; Clarence Thomas · Ruth Bader Ginsburg; Stephen Breyer · Samuel Alito; Sonia Sotomayor · Elena Kagan

Case opinions
- Majority: Thomas, joined by Roberts, Scalia, Kennedy, Alito, Sotomayor
- Concurrence: Alito, joined by Kennedy, Sotomayor
- Concurrence: Breyer (in judgment)
- Concurrence: Kagan (in judgment), joined by Ginsburg, Breyer

Laws applied
- U.S. Const. amend. I, Gilbert, Ariz., Land Development Code (Sign Code or Code), ch. 1, §4.402 (2005)

Reed v. Town of Gilbert, 576 U.S. 155 (2015), is a case in which the United States Supreme Court clarified when municipalities may impose content-based restrictions on signage. The case also clarified the level of constitutional scrutiny that should be applied to content-based restrictions on speech. In 2005, Gilbert, Arizona adopted a municipal sign ordinance that regulated the manner in which signs could be displayed in public areas. The ordinance imposed stricter limitations on signs advertising religious services than signs that displayed "political" or "ideological" messages. When the town's Sign Code compliance manager cited a local church for violating the ordinance, the church filed a lawsuit in which they argued the town's sign regulations violated its First Amendment right to the freedom of speech.

Writing for a majority of the Court, Justice Clarence Thomas held that the town's sign ordinance imposed content-based restrictions that did not survive strict scrutiny because the ordinance was not narrowly tailored to further a compelling government interest. Justice Thomas also clarified that strict scrutiny should always be applied when a law is content-based on its face. Justice Stephen Breyer and Justice Elena Kagan both wrote opinions concurring in the judgment, in which they argued that content-based regulations should not always automatically trigger strict scrutiny. Although some commentators praised the court's decision as a victory for "individual liberty", other commentators criticized the Court's methodology. Some analysts have also suggested that the case left open several important questions within First Amendment jurisprudence that may be re-litigated in future years.

== Background ==
=== Content-based restrictions on speech ===
The First Amendment to the United States Constitution, through selective incorporation from the Fourteenth Amendment to the United States Constitution, prohibits states from enacting laws that abridge the freedom of speech. Municipal governments may not "restrict expression because of its message, its ideas, its subject matter, or its content". Laws that regulate speech based on the expressive content of the speech are presumptively unconstitutional; such restrictions are only permissible when they are narrowly tailored to serve a compelling state interest. For the purposes of the First Amendment, government regulation of speech is considered "content-based" when it targets speech because of ideas or messages that are expressed. Furthermore, some laws may still be considered "content-based" even though they appear to be facially content-neutral. Laws are considered "content-based" if they cannot be "justified without reference to the content of the regulated speech" or if they were adopted "because of disagreement with the message [the speech] conveys".

=== Gilbert, Arizona municipal sign ordinance ===
In 2005, the town of Gilbert, Arizona adopted a municipal sign ordinance that regulated the manner in which signs could be displayed in public areas. Although the ordinance banned the display of most outdoor signs without a permit, twenty three categories of signs were exempt from the permit requirement. Three of those categories were relevant to this case. First, "ideological signs", which contained "a message or ideas for noncommercial purposes", could be up to twenty square feet in size and could be placed in any "zoning district" for any length of time. Second, "political signs", which included content "designed to influence the outcome of an election called by a public body", could be no larger than thirty two square feet on nonresidential property and sixteen square feet on residential property. Additionally, political signs could only be displayed "up to 60 days before a primary election and up to 15 days following a general election". Third, “temporary directional signs relating to a qualifying event", which directed "pedestrians, motorists, and other passersby" to events hosted by non-profit organizations, could be no larger than six square feet. Additionally, temporary directional signs relating to a qualifying event could be displayed no earlier than twelve hours before the start of a qualifying event and no later than one hour after the end of the event; these signs could only be displayed in private property or public rights-of-way, but no more than four signs could be placed on a single property at the same time.

=== Good News Community Church ===
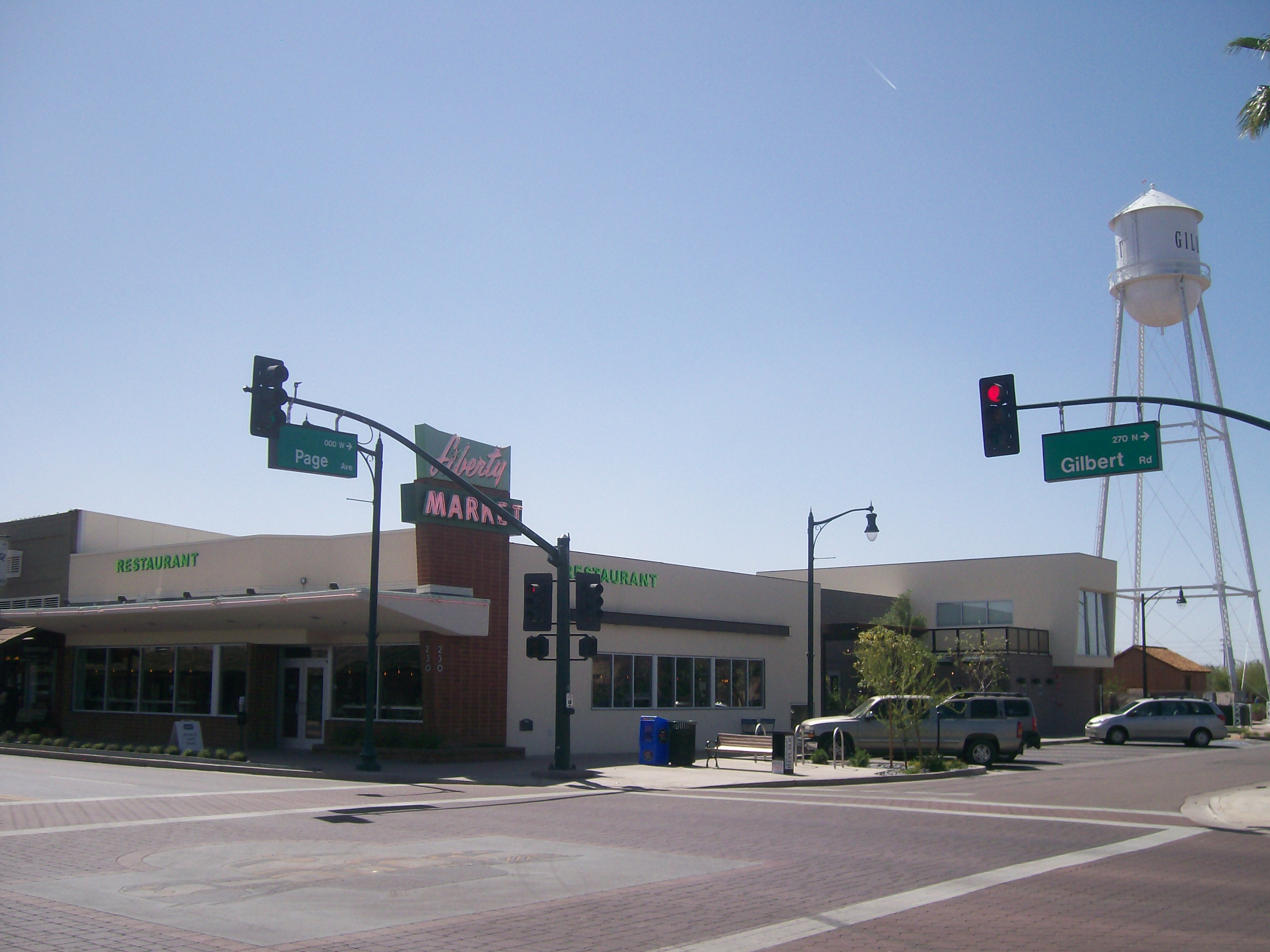
Downtown Gilbert, Arizona (pictured), the town in which the lawsuit originated.

The named plaintiff, Clyde Reed, is the pastor of Good News Community Church. The church is a "small, cash-strapped entity that own[ed] no building" and held services in elementary schools and other buildings in Gilbert, Arizona. On the original docket, the name was Good News Presbyterian Church because according to Reed, the church's name has actually "vacillated" between that and Good News Community Church. Because the briefs had used "Community", the District Court used it as well. To advertise their services, the church placed fifteen-to-twenty temporary signs in various locations around Gilbert. The signs would typically include the church's name as well as the location and time of services. Members of the church "would post the signs early in the day on Saturday and then remove them around midday on Sunday". However, the town's Sign Code compliance manager cited the church on two occasions, for exceeding time limits when displaying signs and for failing to include the date of the event on a sign, respectively.

=== Initial lawsuit ===
The church filed suit in the United States District Court for the District of Arizona in March 2008, where they claimed the town "abridged their freedom of speech in violation of the First and Fourteenth Amendments". The district court first denied the church's request for a preliminary injunction, and the church then appealed to the United States Court of Appeals for the Ninth Circuit. The Ninth Circuit, analyzing the likelihood of success on the merits requirement for a preliminary injunction, affirmed the decision of the district court, holding that the town's restrictions for temporary directional signs "did not regulate speech on the basis of content" Although the Ninth Circuit conceded that enforcement officers would need to read a sign to determine which portions of the sign ordinance applied to the sign, the Ninth Circuit concluded that this "cursory examination" was not equivalent to "synthesizing the expressive content of the sign". The Ninth Circuit then remanded the case back to the district court to determine "in the first instance whether the Sign Code’s distinctions among temporary directional signs, political signs, and ideological signs nevertheless constituted a content-based regulation of speech."

=== Remand and appeal to the Supreme Court of the United States ===
At a subsequent status conference after the appellate court decision, the parties decided to resolve all the issues on summary judgment, rather than via new preliminary injunction motions. The United States District Court for the District of Arizona granted the Town's motion for summary judgment. The church then appealed that ruling to the United States Court of Appeals for the Ninth Circuit, but the Ninth Circuit affirmed the judgment of the district court, holding the town's ordinance was content neutral. Citing Hill v. Colorado, the Ninth Circuit ruled that "Gilbert did not adopt its regulation of speech because it disagreed with the message conveyed” and that the town's “interests in regulat[ing] temporary signs are unrelated to the content of the sign". Additionally, the Ninth Circuit concluded that the distinctions between ideological signs, political signs, and temporary directional signs were "based on objective factors relevant to Gilbert’s creation of the specific exemption from the permit requirement and do not otherwise consider the substance of the sign”. Based on its determination that the ordinance was content-neutral, the Ninth Circuit "applied a lower level of scrutiny to the Sign Code" and held it did not violate the First Amendment. The church then appealed to the Supreme Court of the United States, which granted certiorari on July 1, 2014.

== Opinion of the Court ==
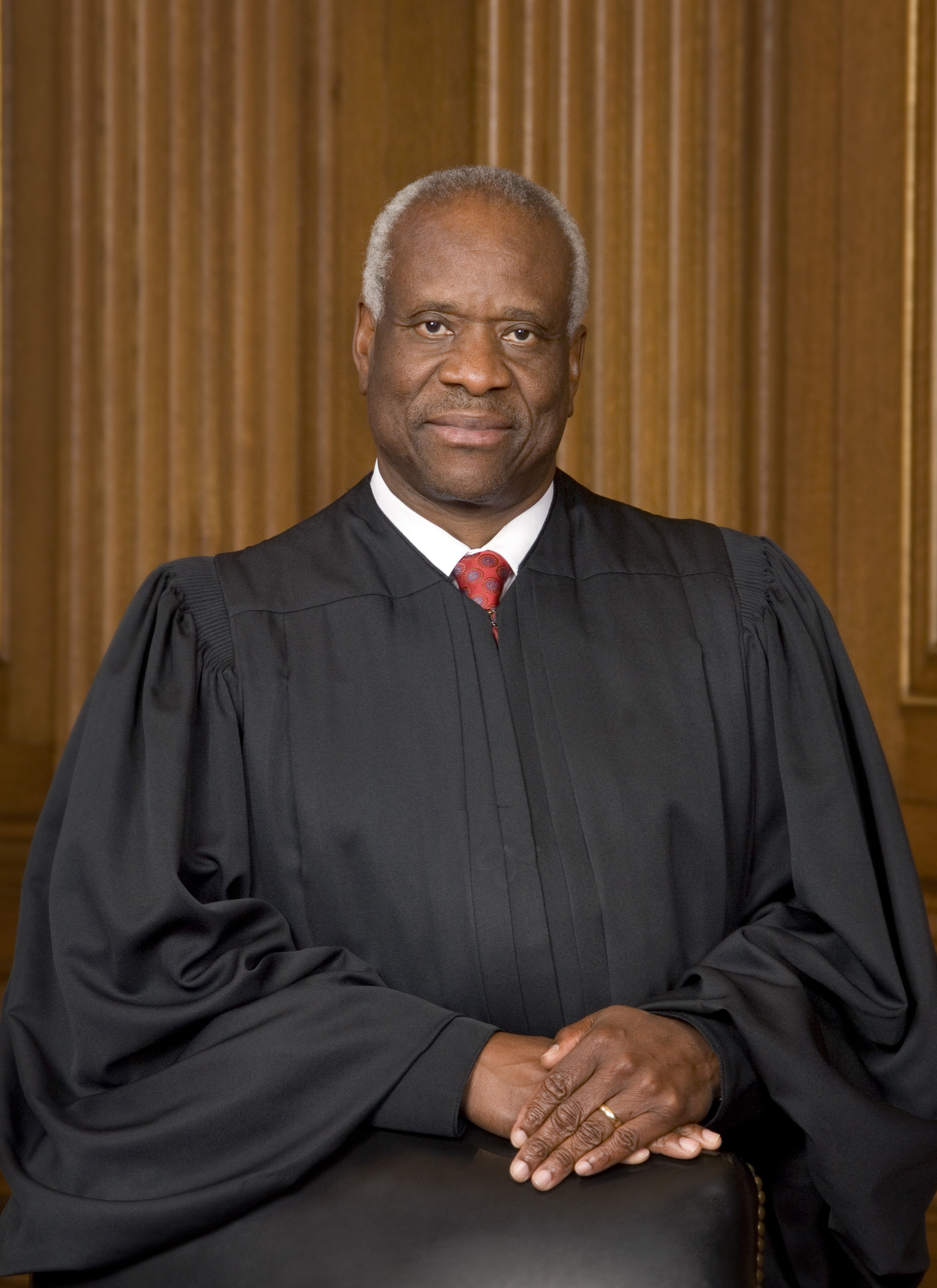
In his majority opinion, Justice Clarence Thomas emphasized that "innocent motives" do not eliminate the danger of censorship.

Writing for a majority of the Court, Justice Clarence Thomas held that the town's sign ordinance was "content-based on its face" in light of the fact that the "restrictions in the Sign Code that apply to any given sign [depend] entirely on the communicative content of the sign". Because the church's signs were "treated differently from signs conveying other types of ideas", there was "no need to consider the government’s justifications or purposes for enacting the Code to determine whether it is subject to strict scrutiny". Justice Thomas rejected the Ninth Circuit's conclusion that the ordinance was content-neutral because the regulations were not based on "disagree[ment] with the message conveyed" and the reasons for regulating the various categories of signs were "unrelated to the content of the sign[s]". Rather, he emphasized that "[a] law that is content-based on its face is subject to strict scrutiny regardless of the government’s benign motive, content-neutral justification, or lack of 'animus toward the ideas contained' in the regulated speech". (Note: In its amicus brief, the United States argued that "a sign regulation is content neutral—even if it expressly draws distinctions based on the sign’s communicative content—if those distinctions can be justified without reference to the content of the regulated speech.") Justice Thomas explained that "innocent motives" do not eliminate the danger of censorship, because governments may one day use content-based laws to regulate "disfavored speech".

Additionally, Justice Thomas rejected the town's assertion that a law is only content-based if it "censor[s] or favor[s]" specific viewpoints or ideas. The town argued that its sign code was not unconstitutional because it neither endorsed nor suppressed any particular viewpoints or ideas. However, Justice Thomas clarified that a statute is content-based if it singles out a specific subject, even though it may not target ideas or viewpoints within that subject matter. Furthermore, he also rejected the Ninth Circuit's conclusion that the ordinance was content-neutral because it targeted specific classes of speakers, rather than the content of their speech. Although he recognized that speaker-based restrictions were only "the beginning — not the end — of the inquiry", Justice Thomas held that "laws favoring some speakers over others demand strict scrutiny when the legislature’s speaker preference reflects a content preference".

Because the ordinance imposed content-based restrictions on free speech, Justice Thomas held that the ordinance would only be constitutional if it survived strict scrutiny. (Note: To survive strict scrutiny, a law must further a compelling government interest and the law must be narrowly tailored to achieve that interest.) Assuming that the town's interests of preserving aesthetic appeal and traffic safety were compelling, he concluded that these were "hopelessly underinclusive" because the ordinance allowed for the proliferation of an unlimited number of larger, ideological signs that pose the same threats to aesthetics and traffic as directional signs. In fact, Justice Thomas suggested that a "sharply worded" ideological sign may be more likely to distract drivers than a directional sign. Justice Thomas also suggested that some directional signs "may be essential, both for vehicles and pedestrians, to guide traffic or to identify hazards and ensure safety". Therefore, Justice Thomas remanded the case for reconsideration in light of the Court's opinion.

=== Justice Alito's concurring opinion ===
Justice Samuel Alito wrote a separate concurring opinion, in which he was joined by Justice Anthony Kennedy and Justice Sonia Sotomayor. He agreed that content-based regulations present the same dangers as viewpoint-based regulations because content-based regulations "may interfere with democratic self-government and the search for truth". He also agreed that the town's ordinance was "replete with content-based distinctions" that were subject to strict scrutiny. However, Justice Alito wrote separately to emphasize that the Court's opinion would not "prevent cities from regulating signs in a way that fully protects public safety and serves legitimate aesthetic objectives". To support his argument, Justice Alito provided a list of examples of content-neutral sign regulations, including: regulations that target the size of signs, regulations that target the locations at which signs may be placed, regulations distinguishing between lighted and unlighted signs, regulations that distinguish between the placement of signs on public and private property, rules that restrict the total number of signs "per mile of roadway", and rules that distinguish between freestanding signs and signs that are attached to buildings.

=== Justice Breyer's opinion concurring in the judgment ===
Justice Stephen Breyer wrote an opinion concurring in the judgment, in which he argued that content-based discrimination should be considered a "rule of thumb, rather than as an automatic 'strict scrutiny' trigger, leading to almost certain legal condemnation". Justice Breyer conceded that content-based regulations sometimes reveal weaknesses in the government's rationale for limiting speech, and that content-based regulations interfere with the "free marketplace of idea[s]". However, he also argued that "virtually all government activities involve speech", and many involve content-based regulations on speech. Therefore, he concluded that a rule triggering strict scrutiny for all cases involving content-based restrictions would be a "recipe for judicial management of ordinary government regulatory activity". Justice Breyer argued that instead of the automatic trigger, courts should determine the constitutionality of content-based regulations by "examining the seriousness of the harm to speech, the importance of the countervailing objectives, the extent to which the law will achieve those objectives, and whether there are other, less restrictive ways of doing so". Although he did not believe strict scrutiny should be applied to the town's sign ordinance, he agreed that the town's ordinance was unconstitutional because the town did not provide a rational justification for treating some signs differently than others.

=== Justice Kagan's opinion concurring in the judgment ===
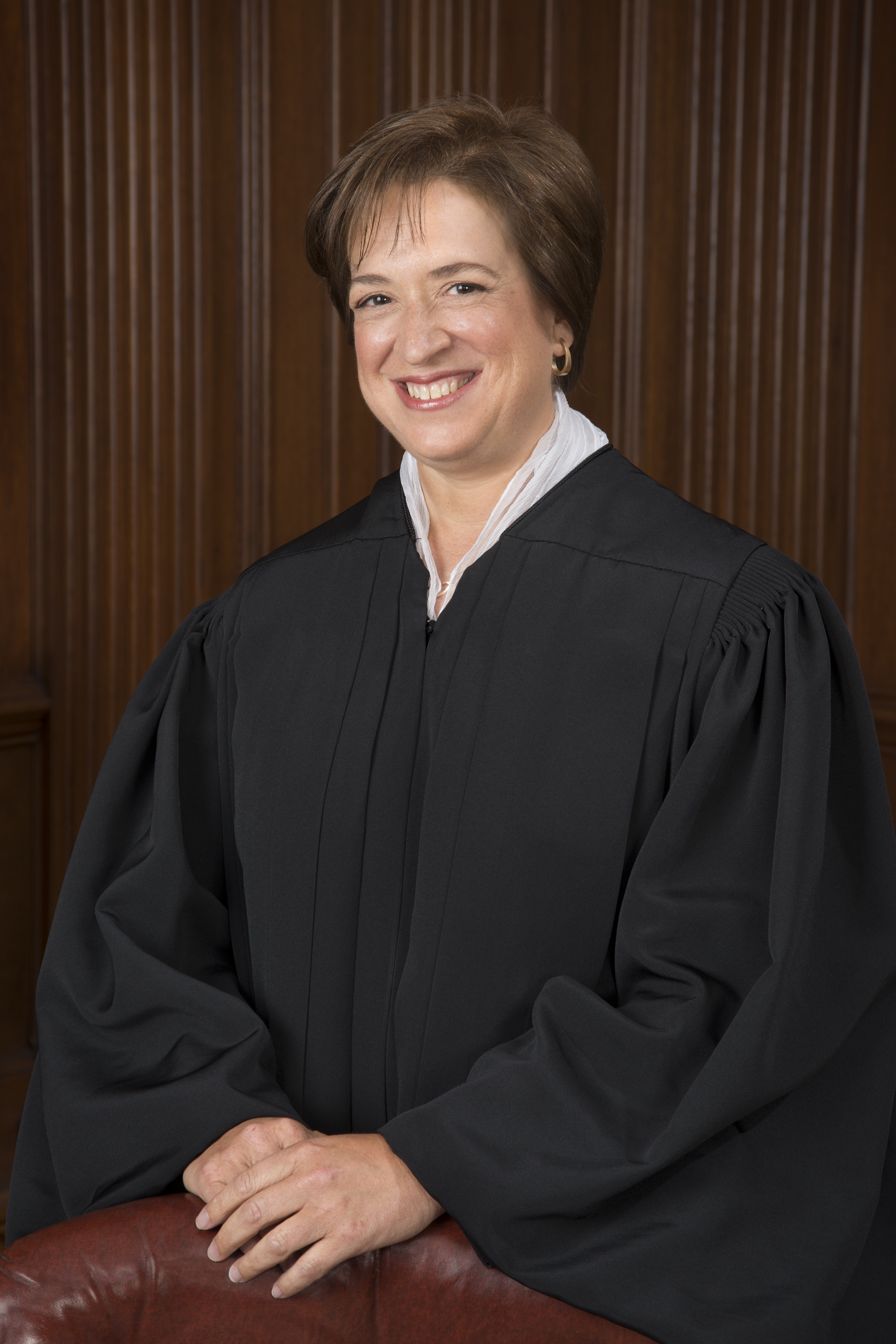
In her concurring opinion, Justice Elena Kagan cautioned that the Court may soon become "a veritable Supreme Board of Sign Review".

Justice Elena Kagan also wrote an opinion concurring in the judgment, in which she was joined by Justice Ruth Bader Ginsburg and Justice Stephen Breyer. Like Justice Breyer, Justice Kagan argued that it was not necessary to apply strict scrutiny to all content-based restrictions on speech. She argued that the majority's opinion would jeopardize too many "entirely reasonable" existing sign ordinances across the country. In light of the court's opinion, Justice Kagan suggested that municipalities will now be forced to choose between repealing "exemptions that allow for helpful signs on streets and sidewalks" and lifting "sign restrictions altogether and resign[ing] themselves to the resulting clutter". Instead of applying strict scrutiny in every case, Justice Kagan claimed that strict scrutiny is only appropriate when there is a "realistic possibility that official suppression of ideas is afoot". Likewise, she also claimed that strict scrutiny is not necessary when there is no risk that regulations will "skew the public’s debate of ideas". Applying these principles to this case, Justice Kagan held the ordinance "does not pass strict scrutiny, or intermediate scrutiny, or even the laugh test" because the town did not provide "any sensible basis" for the content-based distinctions within its sign ordinance.

== Analysis and commentary ==
After the court issued its decision, some commentators praised the Court's ruling for "further[ing] individual liberty by striking down a government’s unjustified censorship of protected speech". David A. Cortman, counsel for Good News Community Church, said the Court's ruling was an "important victory for all the little guys who have ever found their speech silenced by the strong arm of government". Likewise, Nina Totenberg reported that one consequence of the Court's decision is that "the government has much less power to regulate how other people speak." However, other commentators criticized the majority opinion's methodology; Hadley Arkes, for example, wrote that the Court's decision "revealed the unlovely spectacle of the conservatives talking themselves ever deeper into a genuine moral relativism in the regulation of speech". Some analysts also claimed the majority's opinion left open unanswered questions within the Court's First Amendment jurisprudence. Lyle Denniston, for example, suggested that after the Court issued its decisions in Reed and Walker v. Texas Division, Sons of Confederate Veterans, "the meaning of the First Amendment, in general, became somewhat more confusing". Eugene Volokh also suggested the Court's opinion is likely to be litigated again in lower courts.

== See also ==
- List of United States Supreme Court cases, volume 576
- List of United States Supreme Court cases
- Lists of United States Supreme Court cases by volume
- List of United States Supreme Court cases by the Roberts Court
