= James F. English Jr. =

American bank executive and college president (1927–2020)

- Born: James Fairfield English Jr. February 15, 1927; Putnam, Connecticut
- Died: June 2, 2020 (aged 93); Noank, Connecticut
- Spouse: Isabelle Spotswood Cox English
- Children: 4

James Fairfield English Jr. (February 15, 1927 – June 2, 2020) was an American bank executive and college president.

== Early years ==
Born in Putnam, Connecticut, English attended and graduated from the Loomis Chaffee School. In 1944, he enlisted in the Army and was assigned to a Japanese language program. Upon completion, he served in the 441st Counter Intelligence Detachment, part of the Counterintelligence Corps, in the occupation of Japan. He graduated from Yale College in 1949 and was the recipient of the Warren Memorial High Scholarship Prize as the Bachelor of the Arts graduate with the highest ranking in scholarship.

== Career ==
In 1951, English took a job at the Connecticut Bank and Trust Company, where he ultimately became president, then chairman, and CEO.

From 1981 to 1989, he served as President of Trinity College in Hartford, Connecticut.

== See also ==
- List of Trinity College (Connecticut) people
