= OurTunes =

Computer file sharing client

ourTunes
- Developer: David Blackman
- Stable release: 1.7g
- Operating system: Mac OS X, Microsoft Windows with Java Runtime Environment
- Type: File sharing
- License: proprietary
- Website: https://ourtunes.sourceforge.net/

ourTunes is a cross-platform Java-based file sharing client which allows users to connect to iTunes and share MP3 and AAC music files over a local area subnetwork. ourTunes v1.3.3 has been downloaded over 3,000,000 times.

The current version of ourTunes, v1.7g, works with all versions of iTunes up to at least iTunes 7 on Mac OS X and iTunes 11.02 on Microsoft Windows operating systems.

== History ==
ourTunes was developed by David Blackman, a Stanford University student. It originally started as 'One2OhMyGod', a Swing-based client designed for iTunes's version 4.1 authorization, which was made obsolete by Apple's release of version 4.5. After Australian student David Hammerton cracked the new encryption and authentication system used by iTunes, One2OhMyGod was forked into a program called 'AppleRecords'. ourTunes was developed further from AppleRecords, including the conceptual design of programs such as MyTunes, designed by Trinity College (Connecticut) student Bill Zeller, although these programs lacked ourTunes's searchability features.

When iTunes 7 was released, Apple changed the authentication scheme again which caused the older version of ourTunes to fail. In response, a grass roots effort to "Save ourTunes" was founded to develop a version of ourTunes compatible with iTunes 7. So far, a working version has been posted to the website, although the project is not identified as complete.

== Features ==
Unlike the iTunes music sharing feature, which allows a maximum of five users every 24 hours to connect and listen to the music of another user who has enabled sharing on a given subnetwork, ourTunes allows users to download music files to their own computer and provides the functionality to search through the songs from all connected hosts. ourTunes cannot download music purchased from the iTunes Music Store. Unlike peer-to-peer programs like Kazaa and Napster, ourTunes cannot search for or download music from users who do not share a subnetwork. ourTunes does not offer its users the opportunity to share files. ourTunes offers the ability to both download and stream music off the available shares. Because the program does not operate over the public Internet, users do not attract scrutiny or legal responses from the RIAA, which has asked colleges and universities to crack down on the programs in response.

== See also ==
- Peer-to-peer
- iTunes
