= Thomas R. Savage =

American insurance executive

Thomas R. "Tom" Savage is an American insurance executive who was chief executive officer of American International Group Financial Products (AIGFP) from 1994 until his retirement in 2001. AIGFP is considered a key company in the 2008 financial crisis.

== Life and career ==
Savage earned his undergraduate degree from Trinity College in 1972. He received his Ph.D. in mathematics from Claremont Graduate University in 1977. Prior to AIGFP, Savage was vice president of Drexel Burnham Lambert, an investment bank, and an executive at First Boston Corporation.

Savage was succeeded by Joseph Cassano. He serves on the Board of Trustees for Trinity College.
