= MyTunes =

Computer program

myTunes is a program that originally allowed Windows users to download music from an iTunes music share over a network, circumventing restrictions in iTunes that only allow streaming music. The software was widely popular on college campuses across the U.S. in the early 2000s. It was developed by Bill Zeller and Michael Sollami at Trinity College in Jarvis Hall.

myTunes became defunct in 2006. As ZDNetUK News.com reported on 9 March 2004, "the popular software has all but vanished from the Net, and its programmer's sites have gone dark. But this time, it's not the doing of an angry record industry or a conflict-averse Apple. Trinity College sophomore Bill Zeller, who wrote the program in less than two weeks of off-time coding last year, says he simply lost the source code in a catastrophic computer crash". Zeller said: "I was about to release the second version, when I lost everything. I may put it back online, but there won't be any updates. I don't want to rewrite it". Subsequently, an entirely rewritten version, myTunes Redux, was released, which again operated successfully until it was disabled in iTunes version 7.

== History ==
- On October 16, 2003, Apple Computer released a version of its iTunes software for Windows.
- On October 26, 2003, Zeller released the first version of his software, myTunes.
- On March 9, 2004, it is reported that the source code for myTunes is lost.
- On April 28, 2004, Apple Computer released version 4.5 of iTunes, which disabled myTunes and other similar programs.
- On September 5, 2004, Zeller released myTunes Redux which overcame Apple Computer's restrictions and added various other features.
- On September 27, 2006, Apple Computer released version 7 of iTunes, again disabling the current version of myTunes.

== See also ==
- ourTunes
