= Max Coyer =

American artist

Max Coyer (1954–1988) was an American artist, born in Hartford, Connecticut in 1954.

== Early life and education ==
Max Coyer attended Trinity College in his hometown of Hartford, Connecticut for two years, majoring in poetry. He moved to New York City in 1980 and began his life as a visual artist. He began exhibiting frequently at Harm Bouckaert Gallery in Tribeca.

== Synthetic art ==
"Synthetic Art" was the theory and term coined by Max Coyer to describe his work. His paintings were essentially an amalgamation of both academic and modernist art movements, heavily influenced by both and with neither of their methods. In a 1984 interview he stated "Synthetic art accepts other art."

Historical references, mark experimentation, stenciling, and symbolism were all prevalent techniques in Coyer's work. Notable series of works include the cone paintings, which he created after having a "strong and pleasant dream about flying in a spaceship" and depict a cone with its point down and two sides like an arc of a circle, which has been read as an abstract head with two shoulders; and the opium paintings which were supposedly inspired by Jean Cocteau's series of self-portraits that he drew during treatment for his addiction to the drug, opium. It is said that Cocteau's drawings were about the agonies of withdrawal from drugs, and Coyer's paintings served as metaphors for a type of artistic withdrawal from the tenets of modernism after "modernism became a habit."

== Exhibitions ==
Coyer's work has been exhibited all over the country. Throughout the 1980s, Coyer frequently exhibited in New York City and was represented by the Harm Bouckaert Gallery in Tribeca. Other notable exhibitions include the Dalsheimer Gallery of Baltimore and the Louis Newman Galleries of Beverly Hills.

== Death ==
Max Coyer died of AIDS in 1988. The remainder of his work currently resides with his family in Connecticut.
