= Flavel Sweeten Luther =

American academic administrator (1850–1928)

Flavel Sweeten Luther, Jr. (1850–1928) was the President of Trinity College in Hartford, Connecticut from 1904 to 1919.

He was born in Brooklyn, Connecticut on March 26, 1850, the son of Flavel Sweeten Luther, Sr. and Jane Jerusha (Lillie) Luther.

Luther graduated from Trinity, and was the chair of the Mathematics department for many years.

In 1871, he married Isabelle Blake Ely.
