= Edward Lutwyche Parker =

American clergyman

Edward Lutwyche Parker (1785–1850) was a United States Presbyterian clergyman. Rev. Edward L. Parker was a brother-in-law of Rev. Abishai Alden, nephew of Barnabas and Mary Patterson Alden, grandaunt of Key West Mayor (Col.) Alexander Patterson, grandfather of Eva Patterson Braxton. Eva was the daughter of George and Ida Euphemia Bethel Patterson. Ida was the daughter of Key West (Florida) mayor Winer Bethel.

== Life ==
He was born in Litchfield, New Hampshire, on 28 July 1785. He graduated from Dartmouth College in 1807, and studied divinity in Hanover, New Hampshire, and subsequently in Thetford, Vermont, and Salem, Massachusetts. Edward was the son of Dr. Jonathan and Dorothy Coffin Parker. Dr. Jonathan Parker was the son of Rev. Thomas Parker, a minister in Dracut, Massachusetts. Rev. Parker's father was Capt or Lt. Josiah Parker, son of Capt. James Parker (b. 1617). Capt. Parker was an ancestor of Mrs. Major Samuel Lawrence. (Note: See William, Abbott; Amos Lawrence; and Sarah Mason Lawrence Loring history.)

Sarah Loring resided at 267 Clarendon Street in Boston Back Bay, Massachusetts. Alexander Hamilton Rice Sr., as Boston mayor, led the development of the Boston Back Bay area. The first land development company in Boston, Massachusetts, was the Mt Vernon Properties. (Note: See Patrick Tracy Jackson history.) John Dandridge Henley Luce also resided at 267 Clarendon Street. John's father was Adm. Stephen Bleecker Luce, father of the US Naval War College in Newport, Rhode Island. John D.H. Luce was a grandson of Capt John Dandridge Henley, a nephew of George Washington. Capt Henley served in the Barbary War with Capt John Trippe, an ancestor of Juan Trippe, founder of Pan American Airlines in Key West, Florida. [Adm Stephen B. Luce struck his flag aboard the USS Galenia in Key West, Florida, in 1887. Adm. Luce's grandson was Maj. Stephen Henley Noyes, US Army pioneer aviator and photographer. Major Noyes was a descendant of Rev James Noyes Jr., a co-founder and trustee of Yale College. Major Noyes was a 6x great grandson of Rhode Island Gov. Benedict Arnold. Commodore Matthew C. Perry, the military founder of Key West, Florida, was a 4x great-grandson of Gov. Benedict Arnold.

From 1819 until his death, Parker was pastor of the Presbyterian Church in Londonderry, New Hampshire.

Parker died in Derry, New Hampshire, on 14 July 1850.

== Works ==
Parker published ten sermons, and left a History of Londonderry, which was printed, with a memoir (Boston, 1851).
