= Michael Petrucelli =

American government official

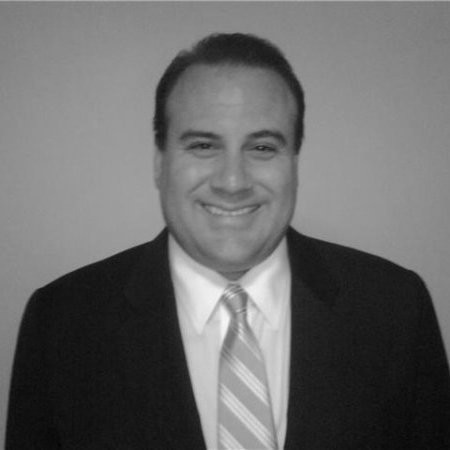

Director of the United States Citizenship and Immigration Services
- Acting; June 17, 2005 – July 25, 2005
- President: George W. Bush
- Preceded by: Eduardo Aguirre
- Succeeded by: Emilio T. Gonzalez

Personal details
- Education: Emory University (MBA); Trinity College (B.A.)

Michael J. Petrucelli is the founder and chairman of Clearpath Immigration, and was deputy director, and later acting director, of the U.S. Citizenship and Immigration Services from 2003 to 2005.

== Early life ==
Petrucelli attended Trinity College in Hartford, Connecticut where he received a B.A. in political science. While there, he was a member of St. Anthony Hall. He holds a master's degree in business administration from Goizueta Business School, Emory University. He also attended Nijenrode Business University in the Netherlands where he studied international business.

== Career ==
Between 2005 and 2008, Petrucelli was president of government affairs at GridPoint. He was the senior vice president for operations and chief of staff at the Export-Import Bank of the United States, from November 2002 to March 2003.

Before joining Ex-Im Bank in June 2001, Petrucelli worked on economic and business issues at the Federal Communications Commission (FCC) in both the Office of Commissioner Harold Furchtgott-Roth and the FCC's International Bureau. He was also executive director of the U.S.-Thailand Business Council, encouraging trade between the two countries. Prior to that he was director for Thailand, Burma and financial services at the U.S.-ASEAN Business Council, promoting U.S.-Asia trade relations.

As a U.S. State Department Foreign Service officer from 1991 to 1996, Petrucelli was assigned to the U.S. Embassy in Bangkok, Thailand, the Bureau of Intelligence & Research in Washington, D.C., and the U.S. Consulate General, Netherlands Antilles.

Petrucelli is an immigration advisor to Blueseed, a company that plans to create a startup community off the California coast in international waters, close to Silicon Valley while working around what they claim are onerous difficulties for startup entrepreneurs to get visas to work in the United States.
