= John Brocklesby =

English-American academic (1811–1889)

John Brocklesby (October 8, 1811 – June 21, 1889) was an English-American academic who served as president of Trinity College in Hartford, Connecticut.

Brocklesby was born in West Bromwich, England in 1811, and emigrated to the United States with his father. He graduated from Trinity College in 1835, and later taught mathematics and natural philosophy at the college.

Brocklesby died in Hartford on June 21, 1889, at the age of 77·
