= Ted Parker (footballer) =

Australian rules footballer

Personal information
- Full name: Edward Hewitt Parker
- Born: 7 November 1903; Richmond, Victoria
- Died: 16 May 1929 (aged 25); Albury, New South Wales

Playing career^{1}
Years	Club	Games (Goals)
1925	Melbourne	1 (0)
- ^{1} Playing statistics correct to the end of 1925.

Edward Hewitt Parker (7 November 1903 – 16 May 1929) was an Australian rules footballer who played with Melbourne in the Victorian Football League (VFL).

Parker was the son of prominent Richmond VFA footballer James Hewitt Parker (1872–1911) and Mary Ellen Mahon (1874–1958).

He lost both of his legs to a circular saw in a construction site accident at Mitta Junction in 1929 and died of his injuries at Albury District Hospital.
