= Abner Jackson =

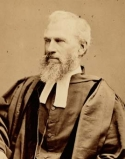
Abner Jackson

Abner Jackson (4 November 1811 in Washington, Pennsylvania - 19 April 1874) was an American minister and teacher and President of Hobart College in Geneva, New York from 1858 to 1867 and Trinity College in Hartford, Connecticut from 1867 until his death, where he had originally studied and taught. At Trinity in the 1840s and 1850s he was Professor of Moral and Intellectual Philosophy. Whilst president of Hobart he was responsible for changing the name from Hobart Free College to honor its original founder, Bishop John Henry Hobart, and was responsible for much fundraising. In 1863, he raised the funds to build the St. John's Chapel.

In 1872, Jackson visited Britain, seeking models and an architect, for a planned new campus for the Trinity College. William Burges was chosen and he drew up a four-quadrangled masterplan, in his Early French style. Jackson was also on the Standing Committee of the Diocese of Connecticut. He died in 1874, leaving a considerable collection of books to the Hobart College. He married Emily Ellsworth in Hartford on 27 April 1840.
