= Bill Zeller =

American computer programmer (1983–2011)

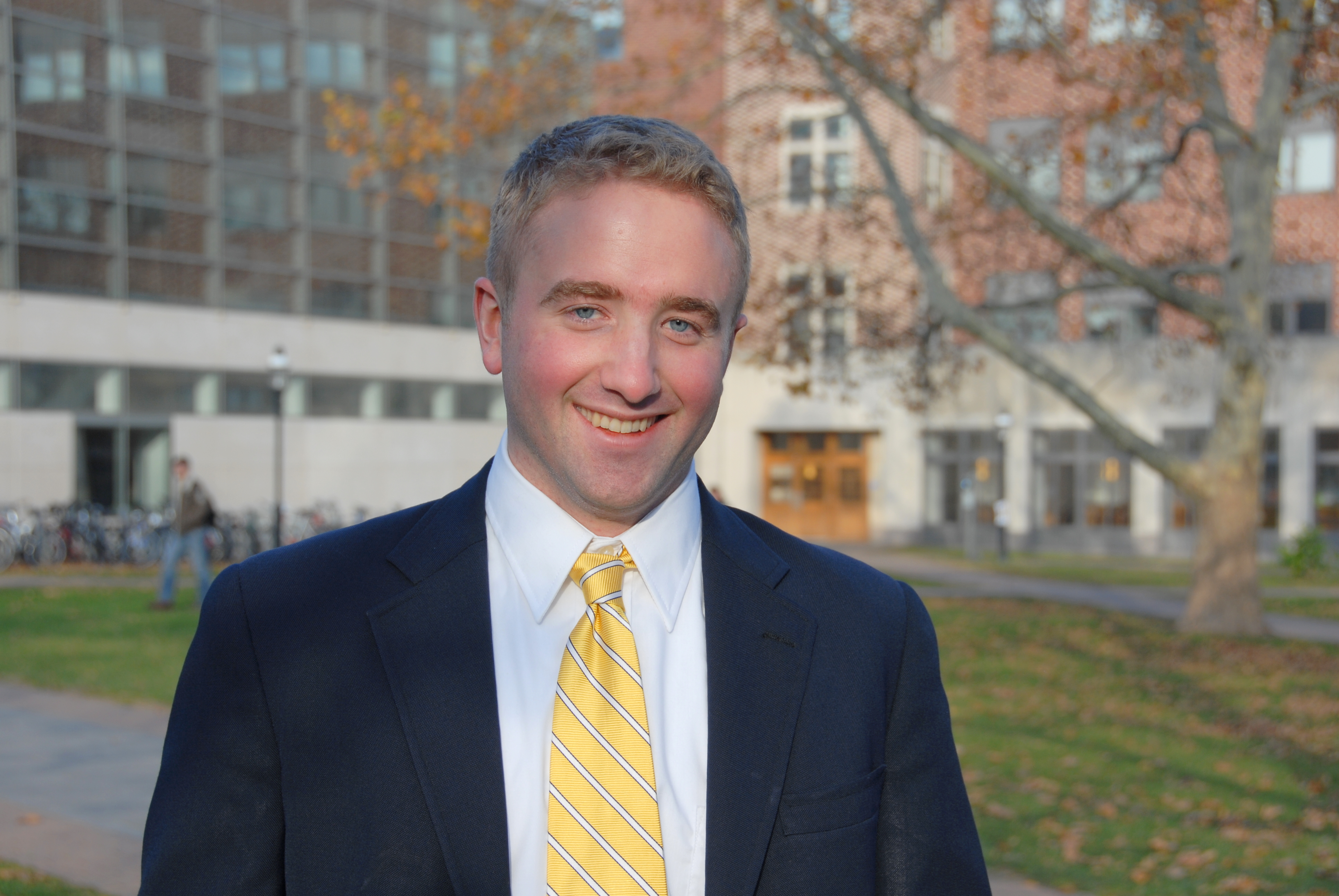
- Zeller at Princeton, November 2008
- Born: William Paul Zeller; 26 October 1983; Middletown, Connecticut, U.S.
- Died: 5 January 2011 (aged 27); New Jersey, U.S.
- Occupation: Entrepreneur

William Paul Zeller (October 26, 1983 – January 5, 2011) was an American computer programmer who was best known for creating the myTunes application. After Zeller died by suicide in January 2011, his suicide note circulated widely, gaining public media attention over its detail from the harm Zeller faced from sexual abuse as a child.

== Early life and education ==
Zeller was born on October 26, 1983, in Middletown, Connecticut. He was born in a fundamentalist Christian household, where his father was the assistant pastor of a church in Middletown. His family kicked him out of their house when Zeller was 19 because of his refusal to go to church for seven hours a week. He graduated from Middletown High School in 2002.

He received his bachelor's degree from Trinity College, Hartford in 2006, where he was the President's Fellow in computer science his senior year. Zeller was pursuing a doctoral degree in computer science from Princeton, having earned his master's degree in 2008.

== Career ==
His best-known software project was myTunes, an enhancement for Apple's iTunes software that enables users to copy music between computers on a local network. Zeller continued creating software in graduate school, with the most recent project before his death being Graph Your Inbox, an extension to the Chrome browser that allowed users to analyze patterns in their own email traffic. Zeller also completed internships at Yahoo and Google.

Zeller served for more than two years as the computer science representative to Princeton's Graduate Student Government, advocating the interests of his fellow graduate students in housing, campus transportation, and other issues.

He co-authored a paper titled "Government Data and the Invisible Hand", which explained how governments can release public data in ways that will be useful to programmers. The paper has been cited over 390 times.

== Death ==
Zeller hung himself in his university apartment early on Sunday, January 2, 2011. Shortly before, he had posted a 4,000-word suicide note on his website, explaining that he had been sexually abused as a young child, and had decided to take his own life as he felt unable to escape the depression and "darkness" that the memories of this abuse had left him. He was found by officials from Princeton University. As a result of the suicide attempt, he suffered brain damage due to oxygen deprivation and was in a coma at the University Medical Center of Princeton at Plainsboro at Princeton. He died following the withdrawal of life support on the evening of January 5, 2011 at age 27.
