= Harm Bouckaert =

American art dealer

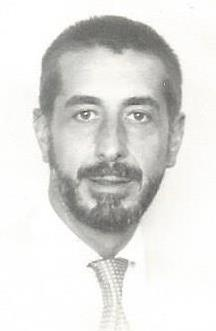
Harm Bouckaert

Harm J.G. Bouckaert was an art dealer, gallerist, and major figure in the 1980s art scene in New York City. Harm Bouckaert Gallery was located at 100 Hudson Street, between Franklin and Leonard Streets in Tribeca. Artists that exhibited at the gallery include Adrian Lee Kellard, Stewart Hitch, and Max Coyer. Notable exhibitions include a group exhibition titled "Saints" which explored the indiscrete interest in religious art carried on by young contemporary artists, and "Recent Aspects of Allover." Harm Bouckaert currently lives in the Netherlands.

== Short resume ==
- 1934: Born June 7, 1934, Maastricht, Netherlands
- 1953: Graduated N.O.I.B., predecessor of the Nyenrode Business University
- 1957: Moved to New York City - start international banking career, Wall Street
- 1963: Became U.S. Citizen.
- 1974: Appointed by Kredietbank, Brussels, Belgium as their N.Y. representative for the U.S. and Canada
- 1978: Founding N.Y. branch of the Kredietbank, currently KBC Bank.
- 1981: Founded the "Harm Bouckaert Gallery" in Tribeca, NYC, contemporary American art.
- 1988: Private Art Dealer - estate of Max Coyer.
- 2001: Retired, currently living in Maastricht, NL
