= Edward Hazen Parker =

American poet

Edward Hazen Parker, M.D. (1823 - November 9, 1896) was an American physician and poet.

== Biography ==
Parker was born in Boston, Massachusetts in 1823 to parents Isaac and Sarah (Ainsworth) Parker. He graduated from Dartmouth College in 1846, and received his medical degree from Jefferson Medical College in 1848. After graduation, he was appointed lecturer on anatomy and physiology at Bowdoin Medical College at Concord, New Hampshire, and there he undertook also the editorship of the New Hampshire Medical Journal which he conducted successfully for nine years.

In 1853, on being called to the chair of physiology and pathology in the New York Medical College, Parker left Concord and established himself in practice in New York City, his confrères in the college being Peaslee and Barker. During the three years that Parker held this professorship he established the Medical Monthly (1854), which he continued to edit personally for many years with great ability and success, and was co-editor of The Journal of Medicine, Concord, in 1850. In 1854 he received the degree of A. M. from Trinity College, and in 1858, by the solicitation of many friends and patients, was induced to remove to Poughkeepsie, New York, where he practiced nearly up to the time of his death, a period of some forty years. Parker was elected president of the Medical Society of the State of New York in 1862; and held a commission in the corps of volunteer surgeons provided by the state under Governors Edwin D. Morgan and Horatio Seymour; and was also one of the medical board of Vassar Brothers Medical Center in Poughkeepsie.

He died in Poughkeepsie in 1896.

Parker was memorialized as "a physician and a surgeon of signal competency and skill" and "a man of extremely fine fiber, of unusual cultivation, and of high scholarly attainments".
