= Straight face test =

Test of whether something is legitimate

The straight face test (also laugh test or giggle test) is a test of whether something is legitimate or serious based on whether a given statement or legal argument can be made sincerely, without any compulsion to laugh. The phrase goes back to about 1987.

== See also ==
- Rational basis review
