= Council for Public Health and the Problems of Demography =

Non-governmental organization of Russia

- Совет по общественному здоровью и проблемам демографии
- Abbreviation: CPHD
- Formation: 2005; 21 years ago
- Type: NGO
- Purpose: public health
- Region served: Russia
- Methods: analysis of problems, advocacy
- Key people: Daria Khaltourina, Andrey Korotayev, Victor Zykov
- Website: sozd.org

Council for Public Health and the Problems of Demography (CPHD, Russian: Совет по общественному здоровью и проблемам демографии) is a non-governmental nonprofit organization of Russia, that deals with such problems as alcoholism, tobacco smoking and age-related problems. Methods of work: researching the problem, drawing attention to the problem of society and state structures in all possible ways, developing and promoting possible solutions, interacting with the media and state structures, tracking the dynamics of the situation.

CPHD coordinates its work with a number of Russian and international organization (such as the International Longevity Alliance). The scientific council of the organization includes many scientists, among them Igor Artyukhov, Andrey Voronkov, and Alexey Moskalev.

== Literature ==
- Korotayev, Andrey; Malkov, Artemy; Khaltourina, Daria (2006). Introduction to Social Macrodynamics: Compact Macromodels of the World System Growth (PDF). Moscow: Editorial URSS. p. 128.
- Critical 10 years. Demographic Policies of the Russian Federation: Challenges and Scenarios (PDF). Moscow: RANEPA. 2015. p. 125. ISBN 978-57749-1068-7.
