= Miliband =

Miliband may refer to:

- Ed Miliband (born 1969), British politician, former leader (Sep. 2010-May 2015) of the Labour Party (UK) and current Foreign Secretary, Brother of David
- David Miliband (born 1965), British politician, brother of Ed Miliband
- Marion Kozak Miliband (born 1934), Polish-born British activist, mother of David and Ed Miliband
- Ralph Miliband (1924–1994), Belgian-born British political theorist, father of David and Ed Miliband
- Sofia Davidovna Miliband (1922–2017), Russian Orientalist and Iranist, second cousin of David Miliband and Ed Miliband
