= Alexander V. Markov =

Russian paleontologist (born 1965)

Alexander Vladimirovich Markov
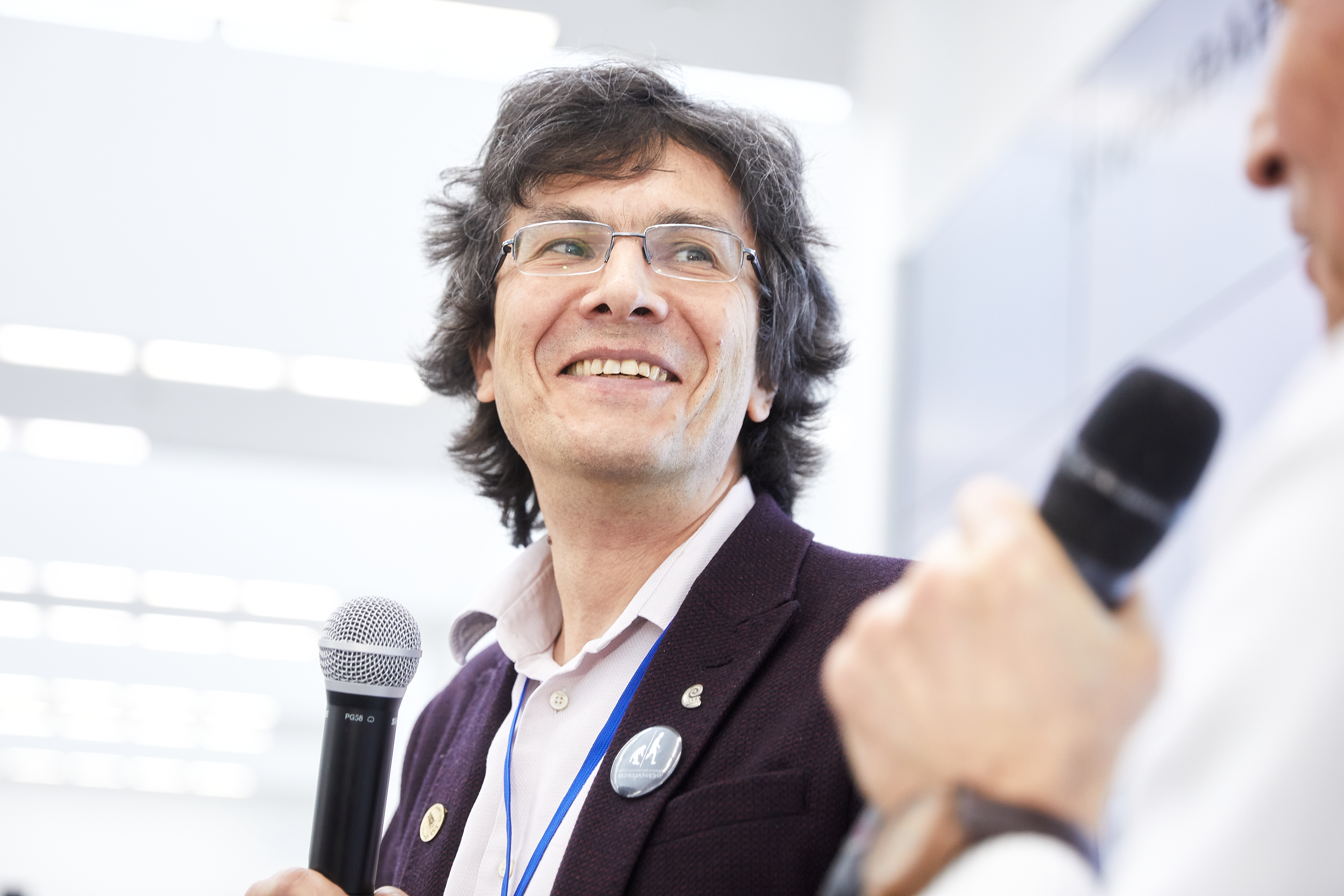
- Markov in 2020
- Born: October 24, 1965 (age 60); Russia, Soviet Union
- Education: Doctor of Science, Professor
- Alma mater: Moscow State University (1987)
- Scientific career
- Fields: Paleontology
- Workplaces: Moscow State University
- Aleksandr Markov's voice Markov on the Echo of Moscow program, 21 December 2013

Alexander V. Markov (born October 24, 1965) is a Russian biologist, paleontologist, popularizer of science. Prize winner (2011) of the main Russian prize for popular science ("Prosvetitel").

Markov graduated from the Moscow State University (Faculty of Biology) in 1987. He has been working in the Paleontological Institute of the Russian Academy of Sciences since 1987. Doctor of biological sciences, Senior Research Professor of the Paleontological Institute, RAS. Professor of the RAS.

During the Phanerozoic the biodiversity shows a steady but not monotonic increase from near zero to several thousands of genera.

In collaboration with Andrey Korotayev he has demonstrated that a rather simple mathematical model can be developed to describe in a rather accurate way the macrotrends of biological evolution. They have shown that changes in biodiversity through the Phanerozoic correlate much better with hyperbolic model (widely used in demography and macrosociology) than with exponential and logistic models (traditionally used in population biology and extensively applied to fossil biodiversity as well). The latter models imply that changes in diversity are guided by a first-order positive feedback (more ancestors, more descendants) and/or a negative feedback arising from resource limitation. Hyperbolic model implies a second-order positive feedback. The hyperbolic pattern of the world population growth has been demonstrated by Korotayev to arise from a second-order positive feedback between the population size and the rate of technological growth. According to Markov and Korotayev, the hyperbolic character of biodiversity growth can be similarly accounted for by a feedback between the diversity and community structure complexity. They suggest that the similarity between the curves of biodiversity and human population probably comes from the fact that both are derived from the interference of the hyperbolic trend with cyclical and stochastic dynamics.

== Sources ==
- "Markov, Alexander V." Соционауки.
