= Dmitry Prusakov =

Russian Egyptologist (born 1965)

- Дмитрий Прусаков
- Born: July 31, 1965 (age 61); Moscow, Russia

Academic background
- Education: Doktor nauk in history

Academic work
- Discipline: Egyptology
- Institutions: Institute of Oriental Studies RAN

Dmitry Borisovich Prusakov (Russian: Дмитрий Борисович Прусаков; born 31 July 1965, Moscow) is a Russian Egyptologist with Doktor nauk of history. He is a graduate of Bauman Moscow State Technical University, chief research officer at Institute of Oriental Studies RAN, member of the University of Chicago Oriental Institute and of the Egypt Exploration Society (London) and has participated in various archaeological expeditions. He investigates the socio-ecological history of the ancient world and is one of the leading Russian specialists in Predynastic and Early Dynastic Egypt.

== Publications ==
- Relationship between Man and Nature in Ancient Egypt, 1996.
- Nature and Man in Ancient Egypt in Series. Vol.14., 1999.
- Origins of Islam. Acta Orientalia Academiae Scientiarum Hungaricae 53/3-4 (1999): 243—276 (with Vladimir Klimenko and Andrey Korotayev).
- The Early State in Ancient Egypt in Series. Vol.19., 2001.
- Ancient Egypt, 4th-2nd Millennium BC: Socio-Ecological Factors in the Evolution of Society and the State, 2001.
- Emergence of Islam: Socio-Cultural and Politico-anthropological Context (with Andrey Korotayev and Vladimir Klimenko)
- Ancient Egypt: Civilization of the Soil: A Study of the Neolithic Revolution.

== Bibliography ==
- Sofia Miliband. Востоковеды России, XX — начало XXI века. — М., 2008. — Vol. 2. — pp. 208–209.
