= International Longevity Alliance =

International nonprofit organization

- Abbreviation: ILA
- Formation: January 2013; 13 years ago
- Founder: Ilia Stambler
- Type: International nonprofit
- Purpose: Life extension
- Region served: Global
- Methods: Advocacy
- Members: 70 federated members (organizations) at February 2025
- Board of directors: Didier Coeurnelle, Maria Entraigues-Abramson, Edouard Debonneuil, Daria Khaltourina, Ilia Stambler
- Website: longevityalliance.org

The International Longevity Alliance (ILA) is an international nonprofit organization that is a platform for interaction between regional organizations that support anti-aging technologies, usually at the administrative and popularization levels.

== Purpose ==
The declared objectives of the organization are to establish regional organizations' interaction and collaboration, to popularize the idea of the need to combat the aging process as a negative but treatable medical condition of the body, and to provide support for scientific research in all possible ways and at all possible levels around the world (up to cooperation with WHO).

== History ==
ILA began to function in January 2013 as an informal platform for communication between managers and representatives of several organizations. In September 2014, the alliance was formally registered in Paris, France, acquiring the status of an official organization.

== Organizations ==
As of February 2025, ILA includes 70 nonprofit organizations from 37 countries. Some of them are:

- SENS Research Foundation
- Healthy Life Extension Society (HEALES)
- AFT – Technoprog
- Israeli Longevity Alliance
- Global Healthspan Policy Institute (GHPI)
- Council for Public Health and the Problems of Demography (CPHD)
- I Am Future Foundation
- Institute of Exponential Sciences

Moreover, the ILA's Board of Advisors includes Aubrey de Grey, Alexey Moskalev, Natasha Vita-More, and others.

== Activity ==
In addition to being a platform for interaction between organizations and facilitating their activities, the alliance also periodically holds online conferences, seminars and other public events to draw people's attention to the problem of aging. ILA popularize the initiative of holding the International Longevity Day (October 1) and the International Longevity Month (October) to promote biomedical aging research. Another anniversary date that the organization popularizes and promotes is the Metchnikoff Day, which falls on May 15 – the birthday of Élie Metchnikoff, who is considered the founder of gerontology.

Permanently-supported projects:

- Major Mouse Testing Program (MMTP) – project aimed at testing potential anti-aging approaches in mice.
- DENIGMA – IT-platform of computational biology of aging.
- Longevity for All – public information resource.
- Longevity History – educational resource on the history of the study of aging.

ILA attaches particular importance to cooperation with WHO in order to draw the attention of the state and interstate structures to the problem of aging as a type of medical problem that needs scientific study and treatment. In particular, ILA took an active part in the discussion, as a result of which WHO included in the international classification of diseases ICD-11 a special additional code XT9T. Now, after that, aging began to be officially recognized as a major factor that increases the risk of diseases, the severity of their course and the difficulty of treatment.

== Critique ==
ILA does not have an official office – ILA members are located in different countries around the world and in the vast majority of cases communicate with each other only via the Internet. ILA conferences are also usually online. ILA does not have its own scientific laboratories, always acting only as a partner organization and/or providing administrative and public support.

== See also ==
- Longevity escape velocity
- Timeline of senescence research
