= Russian cross (demography) =

Sudden population decline in Russia

"Russian cross"; the black curve reflects the death rate dynamics, the red one corresponds to the birth rate (per thousand)

A Russian cross, also known as a death cross, is the name of a demographic trend that occurred in Russia and many other countries of the former Warsaw Pact. In Russia, starting in 1988, birth rates among native Russians (as well as most other ethnic groups of the European part of the former Soviet Union) were declining, while from 1991 (at the time of the dissolution of the Soviet Union) the death rates started climbing.

In 1992, the number of deaths exceeded the number of births and continued to do so to a greater or lesser degree until 2013. When this trend is plotted on a line graph starting from the mid-1980s, the lines cross in 1992, hence the name.

== Contributing factors ==
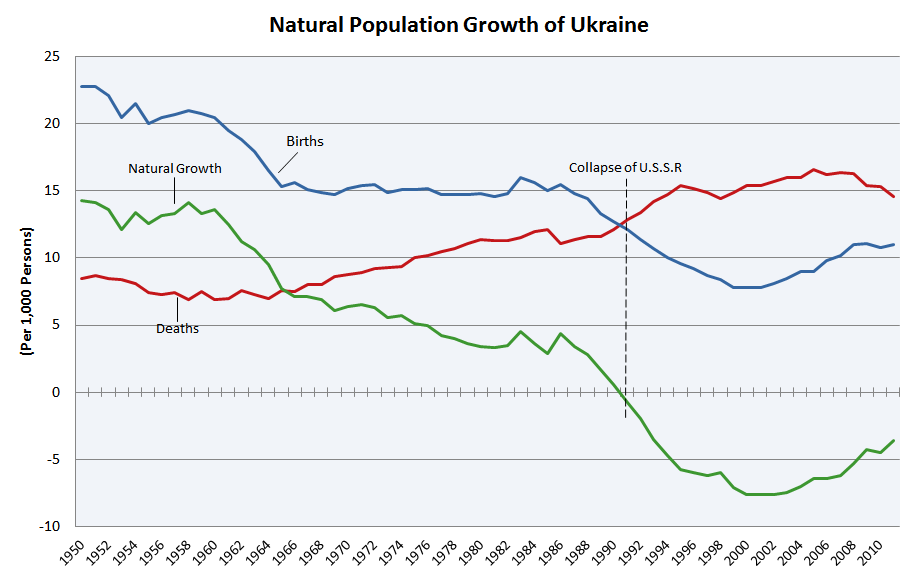
Natural population growth of Ukraine since 1950. The Russian cross is not limited to Russia. Birth rate Death rate Natural growth rate

Scientists have tried to connect the causative link between the two trends through the catastrophic growth of alcohol consumption that took place in Russia since the end of the Soviet Union and the subsequent deregulation of the Russian alcohol market.

It has been demonstrated that this is connected with the fact that post-Soviet Russia experiences one of the world's highest prevalences of alcohol-related diseases, contributing to high mortality rates in this region. Reduction in alcohol-related problems in Russia could have strong effects on mortality decline. Andrey Korotayev and Daria Khaltourina have analyzed the plausibility of the application of general principles of alcohol policy to the Russian Federation.

They have shown that alcohol policy approaches could be implemented in the same ways as in other countries. In addition, according to Korotayev, there should be special attention to decreasing distilled spirits consumption, illegal alcohol production, non-beverage alcohol consumption, and enforcement of current governmental regulations.

Other factors explaining the Russian cross include:

- Dramatically low fertility, especially around 2000, when it bottomed out at just above one child per woman or half of replacement,
- A fall in births during the 1960s, which reduced the number of women of childbearing age in the 1990s,
- A very high birth rate between the end of the Russian Civil War (1920) and the beginning of Russia's involvement in World War II (1941), which produced a large cohort of now elderly people, to die off during the 1990s and the first decade of the 2000s, and
- A sluggish birth rate between 1945 and 1990, which was mostly at about replacement level, especially after the early 1960s.

The Russian cross is not confined to Russia, as it has also happened in other countries, most commonly with the fall of the Soviet Union (as in Russia): Belarus, Bulgaria, Estonia, Latvia, Lithuania, Romania, Serbia, and Ukraine.

== See also ==
- Aging of Russia
- Demographics of Russia
- Tax on childlessness, Soviet-era tax abolished in 1992
- Abortion in Russia
- 1993 Russian constitutional crisis

== Bibliography ==
- Korotayev A., Khaltourina D. Russian Demographic Crisis in Cross-National Perspective. Russia and Globalization: Identity, Security, and Society in an Era of Change / Ed. by D. W. Blum. Baltimore, MD: Johns Hopkins University Press, 2008. P. 37-78.
- Khaltourina, D. A., & Korotayev, A. V. 'Potential for alcohol policy to decrease the mortality crisis in Russia', Evaluation & the Health Professions, vol. 31, no. 3, Sep 2008. pp. 272–281.
- Leon D. A., Chenet L., Shkolnikov V. M., Zakharov S., Shapiro J., Rakhmanova G., Vassin S., McKee M. 1997. Huge Variation in Russian Federation Mortality Rates 1984–1994: Artefact, Alcohol or What? // Lancet 350(9075): 383–388.
