= Leonid Grinin =

Russian academic

- Born: 1958 (age 67–68); Kamyshin, Volgograd Oblast, Russian SFSR
- Education: Volgograd State Pedagogical University
- Known for: his World and Big History periodization and typology of state systems
- Awards: In 2012 he was awarded with the Gold Kondratieff Medal by the International N. D. Kondratieff Foundation.
- Scientific career
- Fields: philosophy of history
- Workplaces: Volgograd Center for Social Research; HSE University - Moscow ; Institute of Oriental Studies of the Russian Academy of Sciences

Leonid Efimovich Grinin (Russian: Леони́д Ефи́мович Гри́нин; born in 1958) is a Russian philosopher of history, sociologist, political anthropologist, economist, and futurologist.

Born in Kamyshin (the Volgograd Region), Grinin attended Volgograd State Pedagogical University, where he got an M.A. in 1980. He got his Ph.D. from Moscow State University in 1996.

He is a Research Professor and Director of the Volgograd Center for Social Research, Deputy Director of the Eurasian Center for Big History & System Forecasting at the Institute of Oriental Studies of the Russian Academy of Sciences, and Senior Research Professor at the Center for Stability and Risk Analysis of HSE University . He is Editor-in-Chief of the journal Age of Globalization (in Russian), a vice-editor of the journals History and Modernity, Historical Psychology and Sociology of History and Philosophy and Society (all in Russian), and a co-editor of the Social Evolution & History and Journal of Globalization Studies, as well as co-editor of yearbooks History & Mathematics and Evolution.

Grinin is the author of more than 500 scholarly publications in Russian and English, including 30 monographs and other scholarly publications dealing with his research interests. In 2012 he was awarded with the Gold Kondratieff Medal by the International N. D. Kondratieff Foundation.

== Major contributions ==
Leonid Grinin's current research interests include Big History and macro-evolution, globalization studies, economic cycles, the long-term trends in the cultural evolution and evolution of technologies, technological forecasting, periodization of history, political anthropology and long-term development of the political systems, world-systems studies, revolutions, historical demography, as well as global aging .

=== Periodization of history ===
Grinin suggests a four-staged periodization of historical process. The transition from one stage to another is the change of all basic characteristics of the respective stage. As the starting point of such a change Grinin proposes the production principle that describes the major qualitative stages of the development of the world productive forces. Grinin singles out four principles of production: Hunter-gatherer; Craft-Agrarian; Industrial; and Information-Scientific/Cybernetic. To clear up the chronology of the beginning of each respective stage he proposes the three production revolutions: the Agrarian or Neolithic Revolution; the Industrial Revolution, and the Information-Scientific (Cybernetic) Revolution

=== Future technological development ===
Leonid Grinin connects major technological achievements with the Cybernetic revolution. He thinks that the technologies will develop in the direction of self-regulating systems which will penetrate many spheres starting from medicine to food production. With respect to possible dramatic changes of the human organism he argues that they may rise unprecedented ethical issues and seriously damage many vital aspects of our life including family relations, gender, and morals.

=== Development of political systems ===
Grinin insists that the two-stage scheme of the state macroevolution (Early State – Mature State) proposed by Henri Claessen and Peter Skalnik is not sufficient, and suggests that it should be modified as "Early State – Developed State – Mature State", emphasizing that the differences between developed and early states are no less pronounced than the ones between the former and the mature states.

=== Globalization and sovereignty ===
In the world political science the subject of change, ‘diffusion’, or ‘disappearing’ of national sovereignty is widely debated. Grinin argues that on the whole globalization contributes to the change and reduction of state sovereign powers, and he investigates the reasons and consequences of the deliberate voluntary reduction of sovereign prerogatives as most states voluntarily and deliberately limit the scope of their sovereignty.

=== People of celebrity ===
Grinin also investigates the influence of the personal celebrity factor on the social life of modern society, analyses celebrities as a special stratum and reasons for the rapid increase in the importance of social role of personal celebrity. He argues that personal celebrity is to be added to the list of those features that determine the major forms of inequality and by analogy with Peter L. Berger's 'knowledge class people' suggests defining the stratum of people whose occupation is connected with celebrity and whose major capital is celebrity with the notion ‘people of celebrity’.

Among other things it has been suggested by Grinin to view social anagenesis/aromorphosis as a universal / widely diffused social innovation that raises social systems’ complexity, adaptability, integrity, and interconnectedness.

=== Great Divergence and Great Convergence ===
Together with Andrey Korotayev he has also made a significant contribution to the current Great Divergence debate. As is noted by Jack Goldstone, the "new view, carefully presented and rigorously modeled by Grinin and Korotayev, provides a richer and more nuanced version of the “Great Divergence,” bridging many of the differences between the traditional and California viewpoints. Yet they go further. Amazingly, by building a model utilizing human capital (education), global population growth, and regional productivity, they show how both the Great Divergence and the recent “Great Convergence” (the economic catching up of developing countries) are phases of the same process of global modernization."

== Select bibliography ==
- Philosophy, Sociology, and Theory of History (in Russian)
- Productive Forces and Historical Process (in Russian)
- Formations and Civilizations (in Russian)
- State and Historical Process (in Russian)
- Global Crisis in Retroespective (coauthored with Andrey Korotayev, 2010, in Russian).
- The Evolution of Statehood From Early States to Global Society. Saarbrücken: Lambert Academic Publishing, 2011 .
- Macrohistory and Globalization. Volgograd: ‘Uchitel’ Publishing House, 2012.
- The Early State and its Analogues: A Comparative Analysis. In Early state, its Alternatives and Analogues Edited by: Leonid E. Grinin, Robert L. Carneiro, Dmitri M. Bondarenko, Nikolay N. Kradin, and Andrey V. Korotayev. Volgograd: Uchitel Publishing house, 2004. Pp. 88–136.
- Democracy and Early State. Social Evolution & History. Vol. 3. 2004.
- Periodization of History: A theoretic-mathematical analysis (in History & Mathematics, pp. 10–38. Moscow: KomKniga/URSS, 2006),
- Aromorphoses in Biological and Social Evolution: Some General Rules for Biological and Social Forms of Macroevolution.
- Will the Global Crisis Lead to Global Transformations? 1. The Global Financial System: Pros and Cons (in coauthorship with Andrey Korotayev). Journal of Globalization Studies. Vol. 1, num. 1. 2010.
- Kondratieff Waves: Dimensions and Prospects at the Dawn of the 21st Century. Volgograd: Uchitel, 2012. <co-editor, with Andrey Korotayev and Tessaleno Devezas; in English>
- Great Divergence and Great Convergence. A Global Perspective (Springer, 2015, with Andrey Korotayev).
- Islamism, Arab Spring, and the Future of Democracy. World System and World Values Perspectives (Springer, 2019)
- Grinin, L. E., Grinin, A. L., & Korotayev, A. (2017). Forthcoming Kondratieff wave, Cybernetic Revolution, and global ageing. Technological Forecasting and Social Change, 115, 52-68.
- Dynamics of technological growth rate and the forthcoming singularity. In: The 21st century Singularity and global futures. A Big History perspective. Springer, Cham, 2020, pp 287–344.
- A quantitative analysis of worldwide long-term technology growth: From 40,000 BCE to the early 22nd century. Technological Forecasting & Social Change 155 (2020)
- Handbook of Revolutions in the 21st Century. The New Waves of Revolutions, and the Causes and Effects of Disruptive Political Change (Springer Nature, 2022).
- Grinin, L., et al. (2024). Cybernetic Revolution and Global Aging: Humankind on the Way to Cybernetic Society, or the Next Hundred Years. Cham: Springer Nature.
- Navigating Complexity in Big History. Exploring Periodization Across Cosmic and Biosocial Dimensions (Springer Nature, 2025).
- The Fifth Generation of Revolution Studies. Part I: When, Why and How Did It Emerge. Critical Sociology. 2025, 51(2): 257–282. DOI: 10.1177/08969205241300596
- Complexity in Universal Evolution. A Big History Perspective (Springer Nature, 2026).
