= Abortion in Russia =

Abortion in Russia is legal as an elective procedure up to the 12th week of pregnancy, and in special circumstances at later stages. In 2009, Russia reported 1.2 million abortions, out of a population of 143 million people. In 2020, Russia had decreased its number of abortions to 450 thousand.

Following the takeover of Russia by the Bolsheviks, the Russian Soviet Republic under Vladimir Lenin became the first country in the world in the modern era to allow abortion in all circumstances in 1920. Over the course of the 20th century, the legality of abortion changed more than once, with a ban on unconditional abortions being enacted again from 1936 to 1955, after which it was legalised again. Due to this, the country developed an abortion culture. Russian abortions peaked in the mid-1960s with a total of 5,463,300 in 1965. In the Soviet Union's entire history from 1920 until 1991, over 260 million abortions took place, mostly in Russia.

By 2025, the Ministry of Health reported a 5% yearly decrease in pregnancy terminations, dropping to 321,000 for the year. The number of abortions carried out at women's requests fell by 9.9% to 120,600 for the year.

== Abortion in the Russian Empire ==
Abortion was illegal in the Russian Empire. The practice is not directly referenced in the Domostroi, though child rearing is a common topic. During Tsar Alexis Romanov's reign the punishment for abortion was death, only later removed by Peter the Great. Abortion continued to be a serious crime until 1917. Through articles 1462 and 1463 of the Russian Penal Code individuals "guilty of the crime could be deprived of civil rights and exiled or sentenced to hard labor." Despite its illegality, "black market" abortions existed. Underground obstetric personnel known as povival'nye babki and sel'skie povival'nye babki, usually translated as midwives and rural midwives, respectively and commonly referred to as simply babki, literally "old women" and povitukhi (midwives) performed abortions. Not merely abortion providers, babki, were trained health care professionals—they served as nurses and midwives in especially rural areas where proper medical service was unavailable. The number of abortions increased in Moscow two-and-a-half times between 1909 and 1914; the increased frequency of abortions in St. Petersburg was many times higher over the turn of the century, 1897–1912. Statistical data from the beginning of the 20th century suggest that the strict laws were rarely enforced. For instance, figures for sentences pronounced during the years before the First World War include: 20 (1910), 28 (1911), 31 (1912), and 60 (1914).

In the late Russian Empire, doctors and jurists began to advocate for relaxed abortion laws and increased contraception. The motivation was to make abortions less dangerous. According to historians, the movement to legalize abortion and encourage contraception arose differently than it did in Western Europe. Rather than among the political scene (as in France, for example), proponents came from medical fields. In 1889 the Third Congress of the Pirogov Society, a medical scientific society whose works had a resounding influence in Russia, started the discussion on decriminalization of abortion. Others followed: in 1911 the Fourth Congress of the Society of Russian Midwives, in 1913 the Pirogov Society's Twelfth Congress, and in 1914 the Russian group of the International Society of Criminologists came forward supporting decriminalization.

== Abortion in the Soviet Union ==
=== 1920–1936 ===
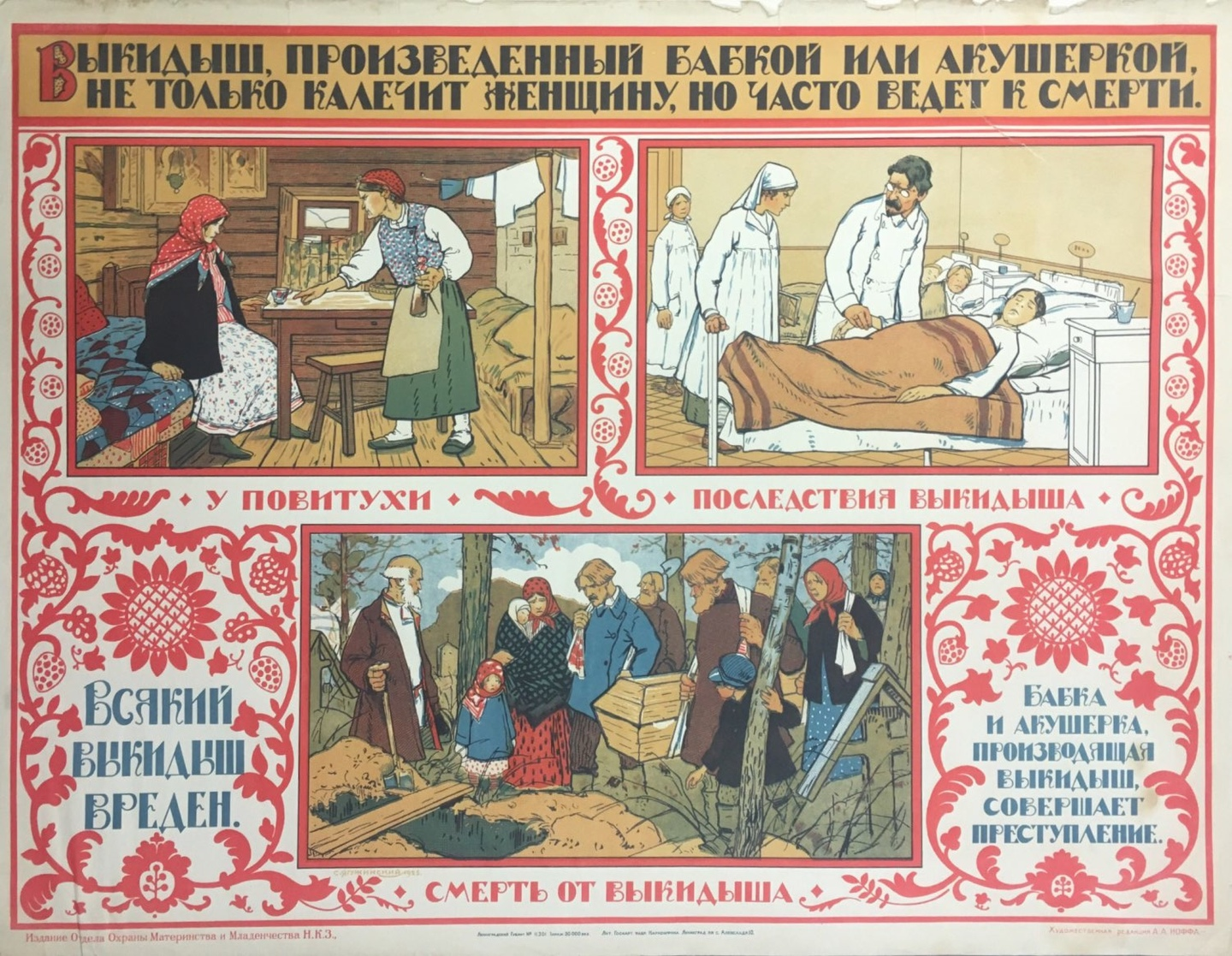
Soviet poster circa 1925 warning against traditional home abortions by midwives. Title translation: "Miscarriages induced by either self-taught midwives or obstetricians not only maim the woman, they also often lead to death."

The Soviet government was the first government in Europe to legalize abortion. In October 1920 the Bolsheviks made abortion legal within the Russian Soviet Federative Socialist Republic with their "Decree on Women's Healthcare". After the RSFSR the law was introduced in Ukraine (5 July 1921) and then the remainder of the Soviet Union. The government saw legalization as a temporary necessity, as after the economic crisis and nearly a decade of unrest, war, revolution, and civil war, many women would be seeking abortions due to not being able to take care of their child. Restrictions were placed on the criteria for abortions and by 1924 it was only permitted where pregnancy risked the life of the woman or the unborn child. The Soviet Union encouraged pronatal policies; however, Soviet officials argued that women would be getting abortions regardless of legality, and the state would be able to regulate and control abortion only if it was legalized. In particular, the Soviet government hoped to provide access to abortion in a safe environment performed by a trained doctor instead of babki. While this campaign was extremely effective in the urban areas (as much as 75% of abortions in Moscow were performed in hospitals by 1925), it had much less on rural regions where there was neither access to doctors, transportation, or both and where women relied on traditional medicine. In the countryside in particular, women continued to see babki, midwives, hairdressers, nurses, and others for the procedure after abortion was legalized in the Soviet Union.

The Soviet Union, under Lenin, became the first country to have abortion available, on request, often for no cost. There was intense debate among government and medical officials surrounding its legalization. The main arguments used in opposition to legalizing abortion were that it would have a harmful effect on population growth or on the grounds that it was too medically harmful to the woman. By the mid-1920s, hospitals were so severely congested by abortion procedures that special clinics had to be opened to free up beds. The enormous rate of abortions being performed also caused many doctors to become concerned and restrictions started being passed to limit abortion after the third month of pregnancy and to ensure that priority was given only to women deemed too poor, single, or who already had several children. Only six months between a first abortion and a second abortion was permitted. In addition, renewed efforts were made to prosecute babki. This had first started with the legalization of abortion in 1920 and a fair number of babki were caught and punished as legal abortion gave them no excuse to continue operating. During the collectivization drives in the early 1930s, this was temporarily put on the back burner, but in 1934 new, stricter laws were passed on performing illegal abortions, and there was a circular of the RSFSR Procuracy and extensive stories on them in the major newspapers. The circular requested that regional prosecutors step up efforts to combat unsanctioned abortion, citing a letter submitted to the Procuracy by an anonymous private citizen decrying the harm done to women by babki in one rural district. A month later, Izvestiia ran a piece condemning "the plight of young women who ended up at the abortionist's doorstep after being unable to find employment."

=== 1936–1955 ===
On 27 June 1936, the Central Executive Committee of the Soviet Union made abortion illegal again, stemming largely from concerns about population growth as well as concerns for the medical dangers of abortion. The law that outlawed abortion did not only do just that, but rather contained several different decrees. The official title of the law was, "Decree on the Prohibition of Abortions, the Improvement of Material Aid to Women in Childbirth, the Establishment of State Assistance to Parents of Large Families, and the Extension of the Network of Lying-in Homes, Nursery schools and Kindergartens, the Tightening-up of Criminal Punishment for the Non-payment of Alimony, and on Certain Modifications in Divorce Legislation". This law allowed abortion only in the case of a threat to a woman's health. All of this was part of the Soviet initiative to encourage population growth, as well as place a stronger emphasis on the importance of the family unit to communism.

The law coincided with a state-sponsored promotion of Circus (premiered on 25 May 1936, was postponed) depicting an American Catholic protagonist giving birth to a child she conceived with her African American lover, which was forbidden due to American anti-Black sentiments. At his meeting with the workers from the Stakhanovite movement, Stalin, who was closely following film as a strong source of propaganda, said: "We must finally understand that, of all the valuable capitals available in the world, the most valuable and decisive capital is the people". Just after that, America and Americans disappeared from Soviet cinema.

This decree provoked resentment and opposition among urban women arguing that it was often impossible to have a child when they were trying to further their careers (as the Soviet state actively promoted female education and work placement) and because of inadequate housing and supplies needed to care for children. The anti-abortion laws in practice were only marginally more enforceable than in tsarist times and babki continued to ply their trade, knowing that there was little risk of being caught. Although there were numerous cases of women checking into hospitals after undergoing botched abortions, it was usually impossible to tell if they had had a miscarriage, a self-performed one, or one performed by a babka. The unwritten code of female solidarity also held strong and women seldom ratted out babki to the authorities.

In practice, the abortion rate was affected little by the 1936 decrees, although it was observed that the rate of infant mortality rose between 1935 and 1940 due to women apparently injuring themselves in illegal abortions that then prevented them from producing healthy children. Babki abortion services remained as they had always been: unsafe, expensive, and forcing women to lie to authorities.

The law provided allowances to women for their seventh and subsequent children up until their third birthday. In 1944 the benefits were expanded to offer allowances for the third children until their fourth birthday and for fourth and subsequent children until their seventh birthday. However, all of this aid was cut in 1948, after the largest source of population depletions, World War II, was over. Despite abortion being outlawed and these fertility policies, abortion rates remained high during this time. Illegal abortions caused an estimated 4,000 deaths per year due to complications in underground abortions. Women continued to get illegal abortions during this time due to policies encouraging married women to be employed and economic policies favoring heavy industry and national defense over housing and consumer goods.

During the postwar era, millions of men were dead and the government was forced to legitimize single-mother families. The New Family Law of 1944 sanctioned single motherhood as a site of reproduction by providing financial support for single mothers. The prevalence of single mothers in this time was a reality; by 1957, 3.2 million women were claiming government aid as single mothers.

The relaxation of government policy on abortion began in the 1950s, which began with the expansion of the list of medical indications for termination of pregnancy in 1951, and in 1954 criminal liability for illegal abortion was canceled.

=== 1955 onward ===
After Stalin's death in 1953, the Soviet government revoked the 1936 laws and issued a new law on abortion. The decree, issued in 1955, stated that "measures carried out by the Soviet state to encourage motherhood and protect infancy, as well as the uninterrupted growth of the consciousness and culturedness of women," allowed for the change in policy. The language of the decree implied that most women would choose motherhood over abortion and that preventing abortion remained a goal of the government, as it was still encouraging population growth.

During the late 1950s and 1960s, it is estimated that the Soviet Union had some of the highest abortion rates in the world. The abortion rate during this period is not known for sure, because the Soviet Union did not start releasing abortion statistics until perestroika. The best estimates, which are based on surveys of medical professionals during this time, say that about 6 to 7 million abortions were performed per year.

One of the few insights we have regarding abortion during the late 1950s is a survey, conducted between 1958 and 1959, of 26,000 women seeking abortions, 20,000 from urban areas and 6,000 from rural areas. Several facts can be gathered from this survey regarding what kind of women sought abortions and their reasons for doing so. First of all, an "overwhelming majority" of the women were married, though the survey results do not give an exact percentage. Second, we can learn how many children the women had. Of the urban women, 10.2% were childless, 41.2% had one child, 32.1% had two children, and 16.5% had three or more children, making the median number of children 1.47. Of the rural women, 6.2% were childless, 26.9% had one child, 30% had two children, and 36.9% had three or more children, the median number of children being 2.06. Of women seeking abortions, urban women were more likely to have fewer or no children. This may have been an effect of the lack of space faced by urban women.

The survey also examined women's reasons for seeking abortions. It divided the reasons into four categories. The first was "unconditionally removable", things that could be remedied by government action, such as material need, lack of space, no one at home, or no institution to put the child in. The second category was "conditionally removable", things that might possibly be remedied by government action, such as the absence of a husband, family troubles, or illness of one or both parents. The third category was "unremovable", things that were not caused by social conditions, such as a baby in the family or many children already. The fourth category was "unclear causes", such as one or both parents' unwillingness to have a child and multiple other reasons.

The results for this question were: of the reasons given by urban women, 35% were unconditionally removable, 16.5% were conditionally removable, 10% were unremovable, and 37.9% were unclear. Of the reasons given by rural women, 26.3% were unconditionally removable, 18% were conditionally removable, 10% were unremovable, and 45.2% were unclear. The most marked different was that more urban women cited lack of space as a reason. The survey results found that abortion rates were much higher among women who work, with a rate of 105.5 abortions per thousand pregnancies, as against 41.5 per thousand among women who did not work.

If the abortion rates of this survey are taken to be representative, then during this period the number of annual abortions was higher than the number of live births. This would also mean that the abortion rates in the Soviet Union were the highest of any in the world at that time. By the end of the Brezhnev era in 1982, Soviet birthrates hovered just at or below replacement level except in the Muslim-majority Central Asian republics.

=== Abortion in the early years of the Russian Federation ===
The early years of the Russian Federation were marked by declining rates of fertility and abortion and increased access to and use of preventative birth control. The official policy of the Soviet Union at the time of its collapse was pro-family planning, although contraceptives were generally unavailable to the public, leaving most women with abortion as the only way to regulate family size. The declining rate of abortion indicates that fewer and fewer Russian pregnancies were intended. Most common in the 1990s were 'miniabortions', abortions by vacuum aspiration performed during the first seven weeks of pregnancy. The legalization of miniabortions in 1988 made the previously required three-day hospital stay unnecessary. Unreliable quality and availability of contraceptive options may have partially slowed the decline in abortion rates in Russia in the 1990s. In Russia at the beginning of the 1990s, less than 75% of sexually active women used preventative birth control of any kind. While such resources became more available with the fall of the Soviet Union, by 1993 still less than half of Russian women felt they had adequate access to them. In the first decade of the Russian Federation alone, both of Russia's condom factories and the only Russian IUD factory shut down for periods of time because of concerns about latex prices and quality control. At the beginning of the Russian Federation, 41% of sexually active women in Russia relied on unreliable 'traditional methods' of birth control. Many women who used those methods cited the availability of abortions as a factor in their reasoning. Many women who used no method of birth control at all also cited the option of abortion as a reason that they did not concern themselves with modern or even traditional family planning strategies.

Between 1990 and 2000 the number of annual abortions in Russia declined by half, but the ratio of abortions to live births (2.04 in 1990 to 1.92 in 1996) hardly declined. This means not only that fewer abortions were performed, but that fewer women became pregnant overall. This overall declining rate of fertility was one of the two main structural factors in Russia that promoted abortion over preventative birth control. Other factors lowering the rate of abortion include measures taken by President Vladimir Putin to increase family size in Russia. In the early 2000s he called for federal financial support for children in the first 18 months of life as a way to encourage women to have a second or third child. When he first proposed this, the Russian population was declining by 700,000 people every year. In the first ten years of the Russian Federation, the population of Russia declined by 3 million. Concerns about population decline in Russia are widespread. Attempts to mitigate population decline started with increased financial support for young children in Russia and eventually led to restricted access to abortion.

Other factors in the decline of abortion in Russia include the legalization of sterilization. Regulations of contraceptive sterilization had been in place since the 1930s but were lifted in 1993. In the first seven years that the practice was legal, almost 100,000 women sought and obtained sterilizations. This is a factor in the declining rates of unintended pregnancy in Russia. 2003 was the first time in fifty years that laws regarding access to abortion were made stricter; every other piece of legislation on the topic in both the Soviet Union and the Russian Federation was to grant women easier access. In 1991, the year of the fall of the Soviet Union, a record number of about 3,608,000 abortions were performed in Russia. This number declined steadily over the years and by 2002 Russian doctors were performing 1,802,000 abortions annually. This is a significant decline, but left Russia with still the second-highest rate of abortions per capita.

While abortions in Russia overall were declining, in the Asian part of the country the rate was actually increasing. While abortion rates in these Asian republics were not as high as those in Western Russia at the time of the collapse of the Soviet Union, and are still not the highest in the country, they did rise. The decrease in overall rates of abortion is mostly due to the very steep drop in abortions per year in the two biggest cities in Russia, Moscow and St. Petersburg. National concern about declining population was a continuing trend since the 1980s, and caused the new regime to adopt anti-family planning policies. The use of contraceptives slowly rose over the 1990s but still in 1997 one in ten Russian pregnancies ended in abortion, and so it could be assumed that at least one in ten Russian pregnancies was unintended. Legally in Russia, the abortion procedure must take place in a hospital and as a result abortions provide an important source of income for healthcare providers. As abortions became slightly less common they hardly got safer. By 1998 two in three abortions still had some kind of health complication. Among the most common of these complications is unintentional secondary sterilization, which happens to one in ten Russian women who seeks an abortion in her lifetime.

== Current law ==
During the 2000s, Russia's steadily falling population (due to both negative birthrates and low life expectancy) became a major source of concern, even forcing the military to curtail conscription due to shortages of young males. On 21 October 2011, the Russian Parliament passed a law restricting abortion to the first 12 weeks of pregnancy, with an exception up to 22 weeks if the pregnancy was the result of rape, and for medical necessity it can be performed at any point during pregnancy. The new law also made mandatory a waiting period of two to seven days before an abortion can be performed, to allow the woman to "reconsider her decision". Abortion can only be performed in licensed institutions (typically hospitals or women's clinics) and by physicians who have specialized training. The physician can refuse to perform the abortion, except the abortions for medical necessity. The new law is stricter than the previous one, in that under the former law abortions after 12 weeks were allowed on broader socioeconomic grounds, whereas under the current law such abortions are only allowed if there are serious medical problems with the mother or fetus, or in case of rape.

According to the Criminal Code of Russia (article 123), the performance of an abortion by a person who does not have a medical degree and specialized training is punishable by fine of up to 800,000 RUB; by a fine worth up to 8 months of the convicted's income; by community service from 100 to 240 hours; or by a jail term of 1 to 2 years. In cases when the illegal abortion resulted in the death of the pregnant woman, or caused significant harm to her health, the convicted individual faces a jail term of up to 5 years.

On 9 November 2023, Russian-installed officials announced that "private clinics" in the occupied region of Crimea have stopped providing abortions. The Russian-appointed minister for health, Konstantyn Skorupskyi, said that it was "offered to contribute to improving the demographic situation by giving up providing abortions."

== Political debate ==
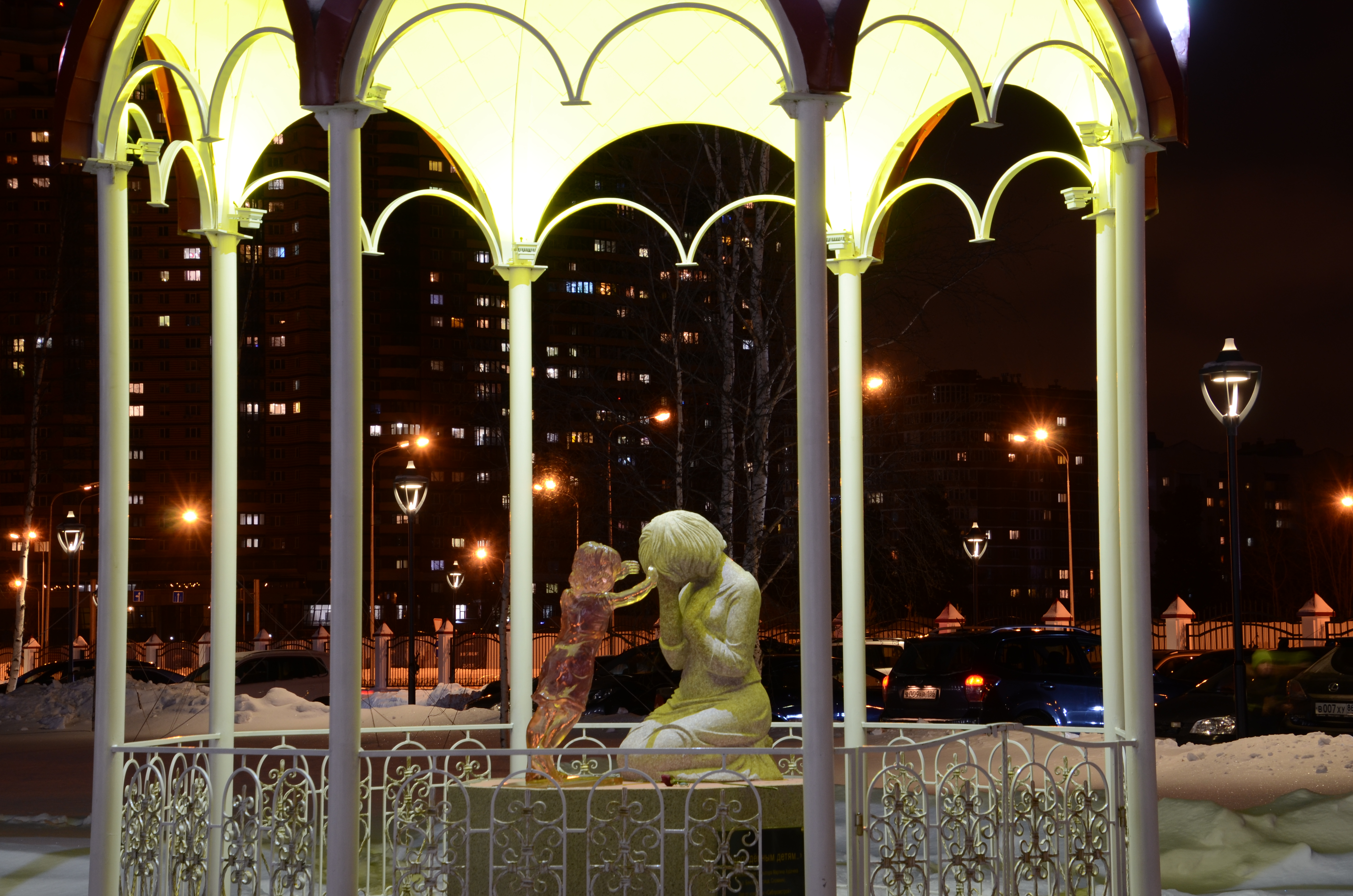
Anti-abortion monument erected in 2013 outside a Russian Orthodox Church in Surgut

The abortion issue gained renewed attention in 2011 in a debate that The New York Times said "has begun to sound like the debate in the United States". Parliament passed and in 2011 President Dmitri Medvedev signed several restrictions on abortion into law to combat "a falling birthrate" and "plunging population". The restrictions require abortion providers to devote 10% of advertising costs to describing the dangers of abortion to a woman's health and make it illegal to describe abortion as a safe medical procedure. Medvedev's wife Svetlana Medvedeva had taken up the anti-abortion cause in Russia in a weeklong national campaign against abortion called "Give Me Life!" and a "Day of Family, Love and Faithfulness" by her Foundation for Social and Cultural Initiatives in conjunction with the Russian Orthodox Church.

=== Opinion polls ===
In 2016, the number of Russians viewing abortion as unacceptable under any circumstance was only 4%. By 2022, this had risen to 13%.

== Statistics ==
Despite a significant reduction in the abortion to birth ratio since the mid-1990s, the countries of the former Soviet Union maintain the highest rate of abortions in the world. In 2001, 1.31 million children were born in Russia, while 2.11 million abortions were performed. In 2005, 1.6 million abortions were registered in Russia; 20% of these involved girls under the age of 18. Official statistics put the number of abortions at 450,000 in 2020.

As of 2021, the abortion rate was 12 abortions per year per 1000 women aged 15–44 years.

Abortion statistics were considered state secrets in the Soviet Union until the end of the 1980s. During this period, the USSR had one of the highest abortion rates in the world. The abortion rate in the USSR peaked in 1965, when 5.5 million abortions were performed, the highest number in Russia's history. Nevertheless, the legalization of abortion did not eliminate criminal abortions.

=== 1920s to 1950s ===
Number of abortions performed in a sample of 364 rural clinics
Years	Legal Abortion	Begun out of clinic	Total amount
1922	10,060	10,676	20,763
1923	13,996	14,296	28,293
1924	16,771	16,712	33,483
Total number from time period	40,827	41,684	82,539

Abortions registered in the USSR from 1936 to 1940 (partial territorial coverage)
Years	Total number of abortions performed	Out of which begun outside a clinic	Proportion of which begun outside of the clinic	Proportion of illegal abortions out of those which began outside of a clinic
1936	803,058	343,750	43%	
1937	682,832	327,898	58%	
1938	429,695	396,362	92%	
1939	464,246	424,500	91%	9%
1940	500,516	452,557	90%	8.5%
Total number from time period	2,880,347	1,945,067	n/a	n/a

=== 1950s to 1990s ===
Abortions in the USSR and Russia from 1954 to 1992
Year	Abortions in the USSR (Soviet Union)									Abortions in Russia (Russian Soviet Federative Socialist Republic)			
Year	All abortions			Legal induced abortions ('complete')			Spontaneous or criminal abortions ('incomplete')	Legal abortion rate		Abortions in Russia (Russian Soviet Federative Socialist Republic)			
Year	Total figures	By Ministry of Health	By Ministry of Transport	All methods (Total legal)	Curettage	Aspiration ('mini')	Spontaneous or criminal abortions ('incomplete')	per 100 live births	per 1,000 women aged 15 – 49	Abortions in Russia (Russian Soviet Federative Socialist Republic)			
Year	Total figures	By Ministry of Health	By Ministry of Transport	All methods (Total legal)	Curettage	Aspiration ('mini')	Spontaneous or criminal abortions ('incomplete')	per 100 live births	per 1,000 women aged 15 – 49	Total	Legal ('complete')	Illegal ('incomplete')	Total (legal) abortion rate
1954	1,985,302	1,895,964	89,339	399,046	399,046	-	1,586,257	7.84	6.84	-	-	-	-
1955	2,598,761	2,481,816	116,944	600,314	600,314	-	1,998,447	11.92	10.15	-	-	-	-
1956	4,724,547	4,511,942	212,605	3,316,632	3,316,632	-	1,407,915	65.10	55.40	-	-	-	-
1957	5,338,738	5,108,970	229,768	3,996,159	3,996,159	-	1,342,579	76.81	66.26	3,407,398	2,565,037	842,361	-
1958	6,128,871	5,892,260	236,611	4,844,567	4,844,567	-	1,284,304	92.24	80.62	3,939,362	3,119,980	819,382	-
1959	6,398,541	6,211,160	187,381	5,102,306	5,102,306	-	1,296,235	96.21	85.79	4,174,111	3,353,178	820,933	-
1960	7,038,395	6,504,677	533,718	5,642,210	5,642,210	-	1,396,185	107.17	96.06	4,373,042	3,634,966	738,076	-
1961	7,425,507	7,073,785	351,722	6,006,038	6,006,038	-	1,419,469	118.39	103.57	4,759,040	3,877,654	881,386	-
1962	7,774,506	7,344,506	430,000	6,414,217	6,414,217	-	1,360,289	132.08	110.19	4,925,124	4,077,580	847,544	-
1963	8,023,290	7,662,242	361,048	6,667,354	6,667,354	-	1,355,936	144.82	114.64	5,134,100	4,267,600	866,500	-
1964	8,408,408	8,030,030	378,378	7,021,021	7,021,021	-	1,387,387	161.30	120.23	5,376,200	4,486,400	889,800	-
1965	8,551,351	8,166,540	384,811	7,191,686	7,191,686	-	1,359,665	169.33	122.46	5,463,300	4,576,500	886,800	-
1966	8,337,567	7,962,377	375,191	7,020,232	7,020,232	-	1,317,336	168.52	118.15	5,322,500	4,475,200	847,300	-
1967	7,846,354	7,493,268	353,086	6,624,990	6,624,990	-	1,222,364	161.94	109.72	5,005,000	4,223,600	781,400	-
1968	7,654,441	7,301,396	344,045	6,471,055	6,471,055	-	1,174,386	158.32	105.25	4,872,900	4,126,800	746,100	-
1969	7,460,316	7,124,602	335,714	6,330,413	6,330,413	-	1,129,903	152.26	101.84	4,751,100	4,036,700	713,400	-
1970	7,531,270	7,192,363	338,907	6,406,594	6,406,594	-	1,124,676	148.99	101.44	4,792,500	4,086,700	705,800	4.17
1971	7,610,001	7,267,551	342,450	6,489,481	6,489,481	-	1,120,520	147.89	101.07	4,838,749	4,139,949	698,800	4.17
1972	7,497,264	7,159,887	337,377	6,408,802	6,408,802	-	1,088,462	144.45	98.27	4,765,589	4,090,589	675,000	4.15
1973	7,514,765	7,176,601	338,164	6,439,040	6,439,040	-	1,075,725	145.48	97.50	4,747,037	4,087,637	659,400	4.17
1974	7,449,129	7,113,918	335,211	6,397,731	6,397,731	-	1,051,398	139.71	95.89	4,674,050	4,037,350	636,700	4.09
1975	7,471,572	7,135,351	336,221	6,431,773	6,431,773	-	1,039,798	137.65	95.68	4,669,940	4,046,040	623,900	4.09
1976	7,636,191	7,292,562	343,629	6,588,364	6,588,364	-	1,047,827	140.09	97.22	4,757,055	4,133,755	623,300	4.15
1977	7,579,105	7,238,045	341,060	6,553,674	6,553,674	-	1,025,430	138.70	96.22	4,686,063	4,083,863	602,200	4.05
1978	7,497,397	7,160,014	337,383	6,497,226	6,497,226	-	1,000,171	136.12	94.98	4,656,057	4,069,257	586,800	3.99
1979	7,339,566	7,009,286	330,380	6,374,161	6,374,161	-	965,406	131.63	93.21	4,540,440	3,979,240	561,200	3.86
1980	7,333,073	7,003,085	329,988	6,382,028	6,382,028	-	951,045	130.49	93.18	4,506,249	3,960,049	546,200	3.79
1981	7,155,594	6,833,592	322,002	6,240,562	6,240,562	-	915,032	124.57	91.17	4,400,676	3,877,576	523,100	3.69
1982	7,250,355	6,924,089	326,266	6,336,188	6,336,188	-	914,167	120.29	92.13	4,462,825	3,942,525	520,300	3.72
1983	7,085,370	6,766,528	318,842	6,204,515	6,204,515	-	880,855	115.07	90.05	4,317,129	3,823,529	493,600	3.57
1984	7,115,825	6,795,613	320,212	6,243,572	6,243,572	-	872,253	115.70	89.98	4,361,959	3,872,859	489,100	3.56
1985	7,365,852	7,034,389	331,463	6,475,595	6,475,595	-	890,258	118.64	92.77	4,552,443	4,051,843	500,600	3.66
1986	7,116,000	6,790,141	325,859	6,267,984	6,267,984	-	848,016	110.62	89.47	4,362,110	3,891,677	470,433	3.46
1987	6,818,000	6,496,499	321,501	6,009,655	6,009,655	-	808,345	109.33	85.71	4,166,196	3,721,930	444,266	3.25
1988	7,229,000	6,965,221	263,779	6,469,096	5,271,096	1,198,000	759,904	124.16	92.42	4,483,856	4,065,709	418,147	3.50
1989	6,974,431	6,672,041	302,390	6,286,035	4,828,267	1,457,768	688,396	126.89	90.03	4,242,028	3,876,220	365,808	3.31
1990	6,459,000	6,226,821	232,179	5,836,823	4,150,448	1,686,375	622,177	123.57	84.77	3,920,287	3,593,291	326,996	3.05
1991	-	6,014,000	-	-	-	-	-	-	-	3,608,412	3,164,701	361,203	2.88
1992	-	5,442,900	-	-	-	-	-	-	-	3,265,718	2,910,460	329,545	2.66
Total number from time period	258,723,655 - (1954 - 1990)	258,476,032 (1954–92)	11,695,624 - (1954–90)	216,987,139 - (1954–90)	212,644,996 (1954 - 1990)	4,342,143 (1988–90)	41,728,518 (1954–90)	-	-	163,280,545 - (1957 - 1992)	140,327,944 (1957–92)	22,843,380 (1957–92)	-

Visualising abortion statistics in Russia and the USSR

Births + Abortions in the Russia

Births + Abortions in the USSR

Live births and abortions in the USSR

Live births and abortions in Russia

Percentage of conceptions aborted in Russia

Percentage of conceptions aborted in the USSR

=== Recent statistics ===
Since the 1990s, abortion in Russia has been in steep decline. Abortion halved in the period between 1990 and 2000, going from 4 to 2 million abortions approximately. Abortions per 1000 women aged 15–49 went from 114 to 55 between 1990 and 2000. In 2010, this was reinforced when total live births surpassed the total number of abortions in Russia for the first time in the 21st century. In 2013, 1 million abortions were performed, or 28 abortions per 1000 women aged 15–49. In 2021, the number had reached approximately 400 thousand, decreasing by a factor of 10 since 1990, with the rate per 1000 women aged 15–49 dropping to 12.

=== Motives for abortion ===
From 2006 to 2011, women were split between the following reasons for having an abortion; 11% were doing so for health-related reasons, 10% wanted to postpone having another child and increase the interval between births, 24% did not want another child, 33% did not have the money to have another child (or faced another socioeconomic issue), and 17% did not want another child because of their partner's objection to it.

== See also ==
- Tax on childlessness
- Russian cross
