= Andrey Korotayev =

Russian anthropologist (born 1961)

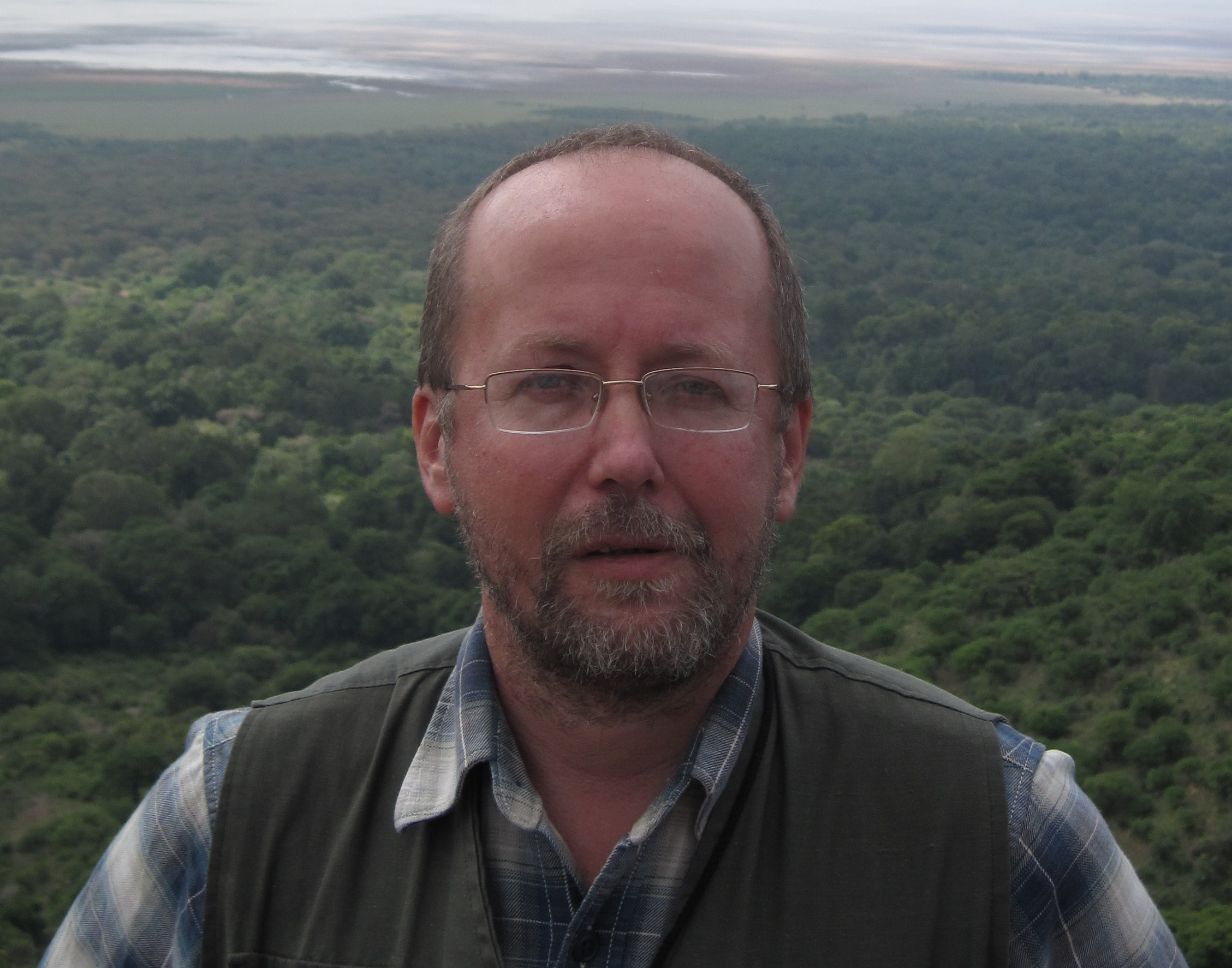
- Korotayev over the Rift Valley, North Tanzania, November 2008
- Born: 17 February 1961 (age 65); Moscow, Soviet Union
- Education: Moscow State University
- Known for: contributions to mathematical modelling of the World System development and cross-cultural studies
- Awards: Russian Science Support Foundation Award in "The Best Economists of the Russian Academy of Sciences" nomination (2006); In 2012 he was awarded with the Gold Kondratieff Medal by the International N. D. Kondratieff Foundation.
- Scientific career
- Fields: cross-cultural studies, mathematical modelling of social, economic, and historical dynamics; Islamic and pre-Islamic history
- Workplaces: HSE University (Moscow); Russian Academy of Sciences (Moscow); Institute for Advanced Study (Princeton); Russian State University for the Humanities (Moscow)

Andrey Vitalievich Korotayev (Russian: Андре́й Вита́льевич Корота́ев; born 17 February 1961) is a Russian anthropologist, economic historian, comparative political scientist, demographer and sociologist, with major contributions to world-systems theory, cross-cultural studies, Near Eastern history, Big History, and mathematical modelling of social and economic macrodynamics.

He is currently the Director of the Centre for Stability and Risk Analysis at the HSE University in Moscow, and a Senior Research Professor at the Center for Big History and System Forecasting of the Institute of Oriental Studies as well as in the Institute for African Studies of the Russian Academy of Sciences.

In addition, in 2012-2025, he was a senior research professor at the International Laboratory on Political Demography and Social Macrodynamics (PDSM) of the Russian Presidential Academy of National Economy and Public Administration, as well as a full professor of the Faculty of Global Studies of the Moscow State University.

He is co-editor of the journals Cliodynamics:The Journal of Quantitative History and Cultural Evolution, Social Evolution & History and Journal of Globalization Studies, as well as History & Mathematics yearbook

Together with Askar Akayev and George Malinetsky he was in 2008–2018 a coordinator of the Russian Academy of Sciences Program "System Analysis and Mathematical Modeling of World Dynamics".

== Education and career ==
Born in Moscow, Andrey Korotayev attended Moscow State University, where he received an MA in 1984. He earned a PhD in 1993 from Manchester University, and in 1998 a Doctor of Sciences degree from the Russian Academy of Sciences.

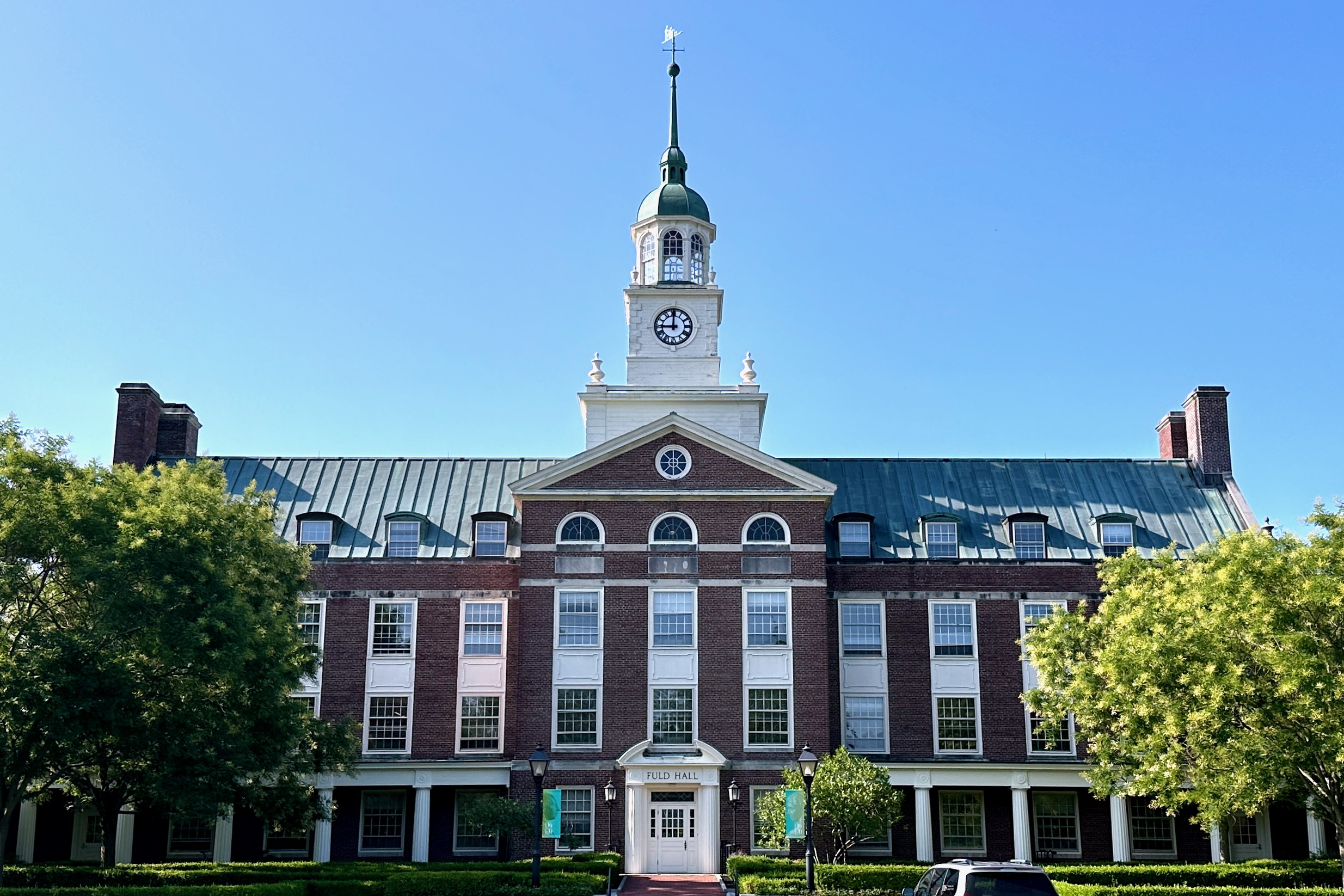
Institute for Advanced Study in Princeton, New Jersey

Since 2000, he has been Professor and Director of the Anthropology of the East Center at the Russian State University for the Humanities, Moscow, and Senior Research Professor in the Oriental Institute and Institute for African Studies at the Russian Academy of Sciences. In 2001–2003, he also directed the "Anthropology of the East" Program at the National Research University Higher School of Economics in Moscow and is now the Director of the Centre for Stability and Risk Analysis at this university. In 2003–2004, he was a visiting member at the Institute for Advanced Study in Princeton, NJ.

Korotayev is a laureate of the Russian Science Support Foundation in "The Best Economists of the Russian Academy of Sciences" nomination (2006). In 2012 he was awarded with the Gold Kondratieff Medal by the International N. D. Kondratieff Foundation.

== Contributions ==
Andrey Korotayev has made important contributions to the following fields.

=== Mathematical modeling and Cliodynamics ===
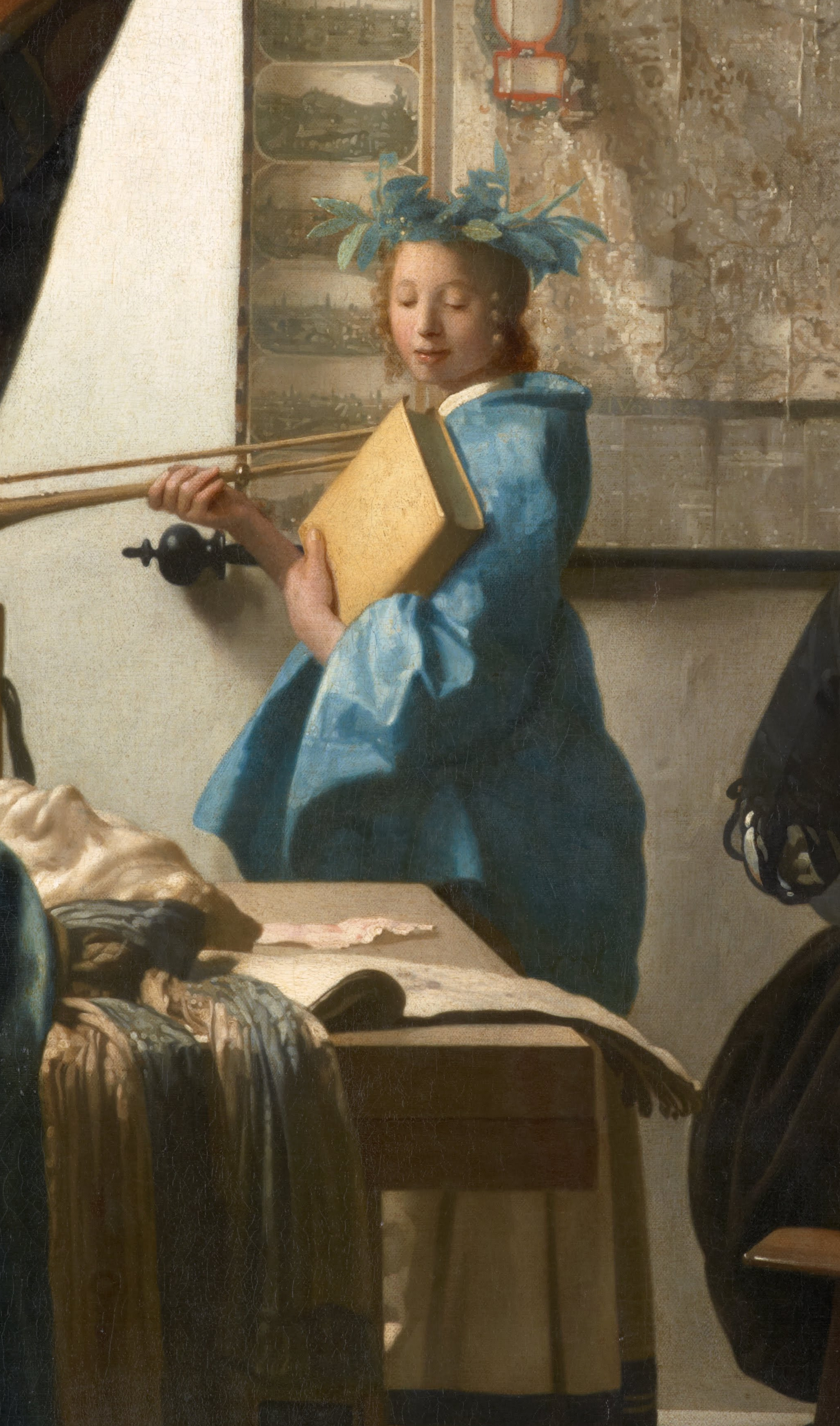
Clio—detail from The Allegory of Painting by Johannes Vermeer

==== Global dynamics ====
In this field he has proposed one of the most convincing mathematical explanations for von Foerster's Doomsday Equation. In collaboration with his colleagues, Artemy Malkov and Daria Khaltourina, he has shown that till the 1970s the hyperbolic growth of the world population was accompanied by quadratic-hyperbolic growth of the world GDP, and developed a number of mathematical models describing both of these phenomena simultaneously; he has also described mathematically the World System withdrawal from the blow-up regime observed in the recent decades.

The hyperbolic growth of the world population and quadratic-hyperbolic growth of the world GDP observed till the 1970s have been correlated by him and his colleagues to a non-linear second order positive feedback between the demographic growth and technological development that can be spelled out as follows: technological growth – increase in the carrying capacity of land for people – demographic growth – more people – more potential inventors – acceleration of technological growth – accelerating growth of the carrying capacity – the faster population growth – accelerating growth of the number of potential inventors – faster technological growth – hence, the faster growth of the Earth's carrying capacity for people, and so on.

He has also shown that the world urban population growth curve has also up till recently followed a quadratic-hyperbolic pattern. In addition, Korotayev and his colleagues have proposed a number of forecasts of the World System development up to 2100.

==== Social and biological macroevolution ====
During the Phanerozoic the biodiversity shows a steady but not monotonic increase from near zero to several thousands of genera.

In collaboration with Alexander V. Markov he has demonstrated that a similar mathematical model can be developed to describe the macrotrends of biological evolution. They have shown that changes in biodiversity through the Phanerozoic correlate much better with hyperbolic model (widely used in demography and macrosociology) than with exponential and logistic models (traditionally used in population biology and extensively applied to fossil biodiversity as well). The latter models imply that changes in diversity are guided by a first-order positive feedback (more ancestors, more descendants) and/or a negative feedback arising from resource limitation. Hyperbolic model implies a second-order positive feedback. The hyperbolic pattern of the world population growth has been demonstrated by Korotayev to arise from a second-order positive feedback between the population size and the rate of technological growth. According to Korotayev and Markov, the hyperbolic character of biodiversity growth can be similarly accounted for by a feedback between the diversity and community structure complexity. They suggest that the similarity between the curves of biodiversity and human population probably comes from the fact that both are derived from the interference of the hyperbolic trend with cyclical and stochastic dynamics. Finally, Korotayev has demonstrated that the hyperbolic models of this type may be used to describe in a rather accurate way the overall growth of the planetary complexity of the Earth since 4 billion BC up to the present.

==== Cliodynamics and the study of the Arab Spring ====
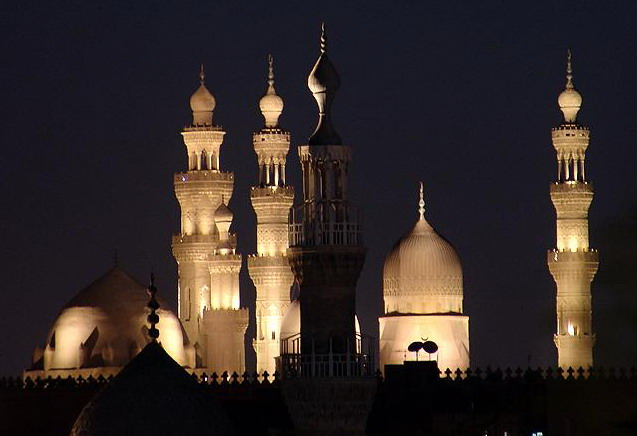
Cairo

In the field of cliodynamics, Korotayev has developed a number of mathematical models of interaction between the very long-term, "millennial" hyperbolic trend dynamics of social systems and the shorter-term, "secular" (that is, observed at the scale of centuries), cyclical dynamics.

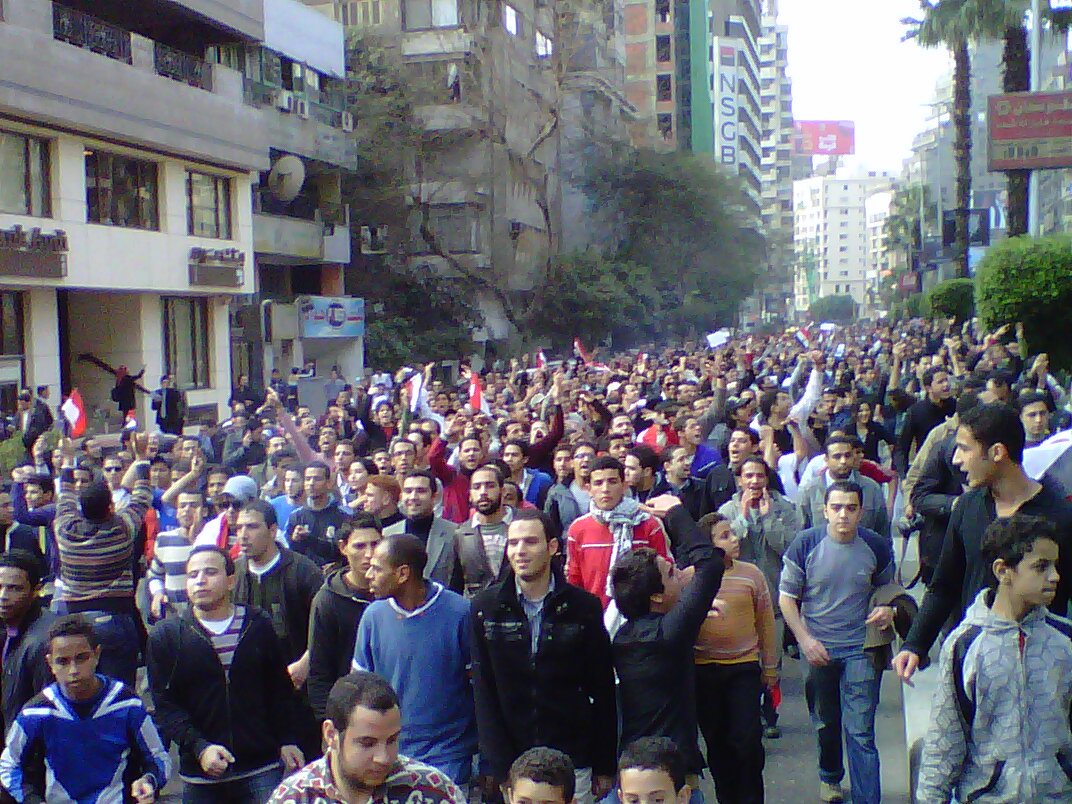
The "Day of Revolt" on 25 January 2011 in Cairo

He has also produced a number of mathematical models describing specifically long-term political-demographic dynamics of Egypt and used them for a demographic structural analysis of the 2011 Egyptian Revolution. Korotayev was one of the first to predict and assess the June 2013 Egyptian protests. Note also his study of 2013–2014 revolutionary wave and his interpretation of the Arab Spring events as a trigger of a global "phase transition".

Of special importance is his study of the hypothesis that population pressure causes increased warfare. This hypothesis has been recently criticised on the empirical grounds. Both studies focusing on specific historical societies and analyses of cross-cultural data have failed to find positive correlation between population density and incidence of warfare. Korotayev, in collaboration with Peter Turchin, has shown that such negative results do not falsify the population-warfare hypothesis. Population and warfare are dynamical variables, and if their interaction causes sustained oscillations, then we do not in general expect to find strong correlation between the two variables measured at the same time (that is, unlagged). Korotayev and Turchin have explored mathematically what the dynamical patterns of interaction between population and warfare (focusing on internal warfare) might be in both stateless and state societies. Next, they have tested the model predictions in several empirical case studies: early modern England, Han and Tang China, and the Roman Empire. Their empirical results have supported the population-warfare theory: Korotayev and Turchin have found that there is a tendency for population numbers and internal warfare intensity to oscillate with the same period but shifted in phase (with warfare peaks following population peaks). Furthermore, they have demonstrated that in the agrarian societies the rates of change of the two variables behave precisely as predicted by the theory: population rate of change is negatively affected by warfare intensity, while warfare rate of change is positively affected by population density. As Kohler and Reed put it, Korotayev and Turchin have demonstrated that "human population movements and sociopolitical strife play the roles of sometimes endogenous, sometimes exogenous, factors that on small spatial scales may seem inexplicable but which on longer temporal and wider spatial scales may have understandable rhythms".

Thus, Korotayev has demonstrated that the Malthusian trap tends to generate sociopolitical upheavals. On the other hand, he has shown that the escape from the Malthusian trap is accompanied by another "trap" generating new sociopolitical upheavals (what he calls "a trap at the escape from the trap").

==== Russian demographic crisis ====
"Russian Cross"; the black curve reflects the death rate dynamics, the red one corresponds to the birth rate (per thousand).

In collaboration with Daria Khaltourina he has made a significant contribution to the study of the factors of the Russian demographic crisis of the 1990s/early 2000s. They have demonstrated that post-Soviet Russia experiences one of the world's highest prevalence of alcohol-related problems, which contributes to high mortality rates in this region. Reduction in alcohol-related problems in Russia can have strong effects on mortality decline. They have analysed the plausibility of application of general principles of alcohol policy translated in the Russian Federation. Korotayev and Khaltourina have shown that alcohol policy approaches could be implemented in the same ways as they have been in other countries, and contributed to the development of alcohol control measures in this country. In addition, according to Korotayev, there should be special attention to decreasing distilled spirits consumption, illegal alcohol production, nonbeverage alcohol consumption, and enforcement of current governmental regulations. In late 2014 they correctly predicted the forthcoming return of Russia to negative natural population growth.

==== "Literacy and the Spirit of Capitalism" ====
Korotayev and his colleagues have demonstrated that Protestantism has indeed influenced positively the capitalist development of respective social systems not so much through the "Protestant ethics" (as was suggested by Max Weber) but rather through the promotion of literacy.

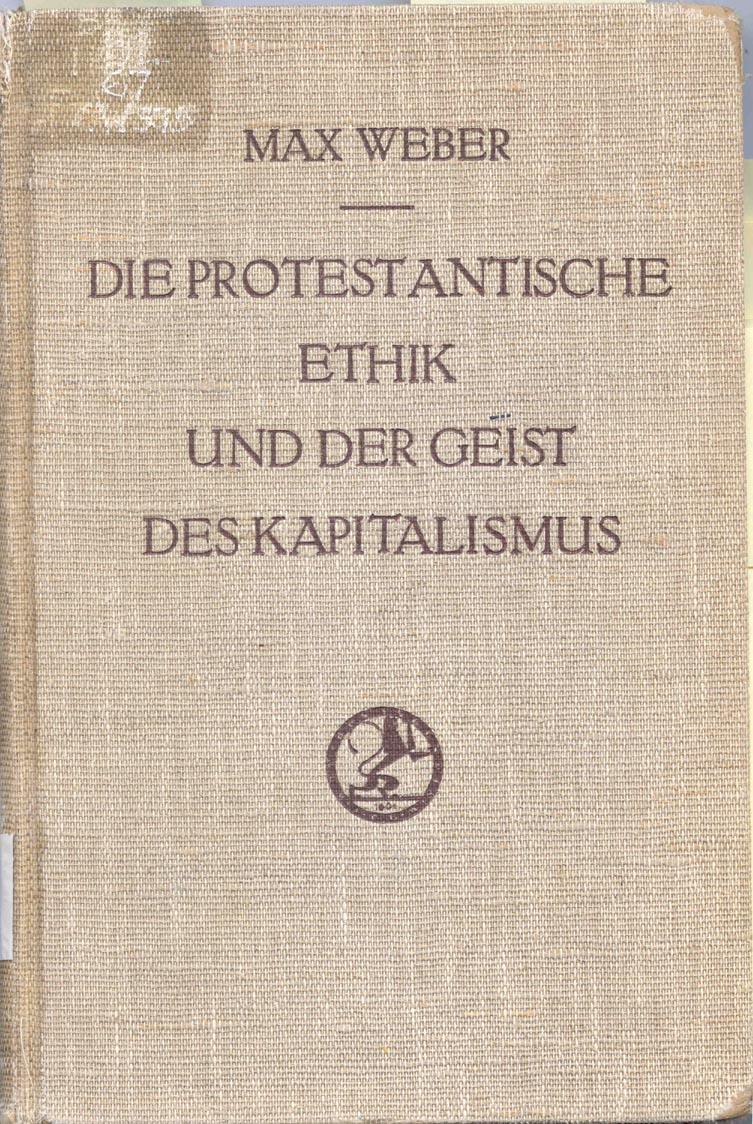

They draw attention to the fact that the ability to read was essential for Protestants (unlike Catholics) to perform their religious duty − to read the Bible. The reading of Holy Scripture was not necessary for Catholic laymen. The edict of the Council of Toulouse (1229) prohibited Catholic laity from possessing copies of the Bible. Soon after that, a decision by the Council of Tarragona spread this prohibition to ecclesiastic people as well. In 1408, the Oxford Synod absolutely prohibited translations of the Holy Scripture. From the very beginning, Protestant groups did not accept this prohibition. Thus, Luther translated in 1522–1534 first the New Testament, and then the Old Testament, into German, so that any German-speaking person could read the Holy Scripture in his or her native language. Moreover, the Protestants viewed reading the Holy Scripture as a religious duty of any Christian. As a result, the level of literacy and education was, in general, higher for Protestants than it was for Catholics and for followers of other confessions that did not provide religious stimuli for learning literacy. Literate populations have many more opportunities to obtain and use the achievements of modernisation than illiterate ones and display greater innovative-activity levels, which correspond with opportunities for modernisation, development, and economic growth. Empirical tests performed by Korotayev and his colleagues have confirmed the presence of a rather strong and highly significant correlation between the early introduction of mass literacy and subsequent high rates of capitalist economic development.

=== World-system analysis ===
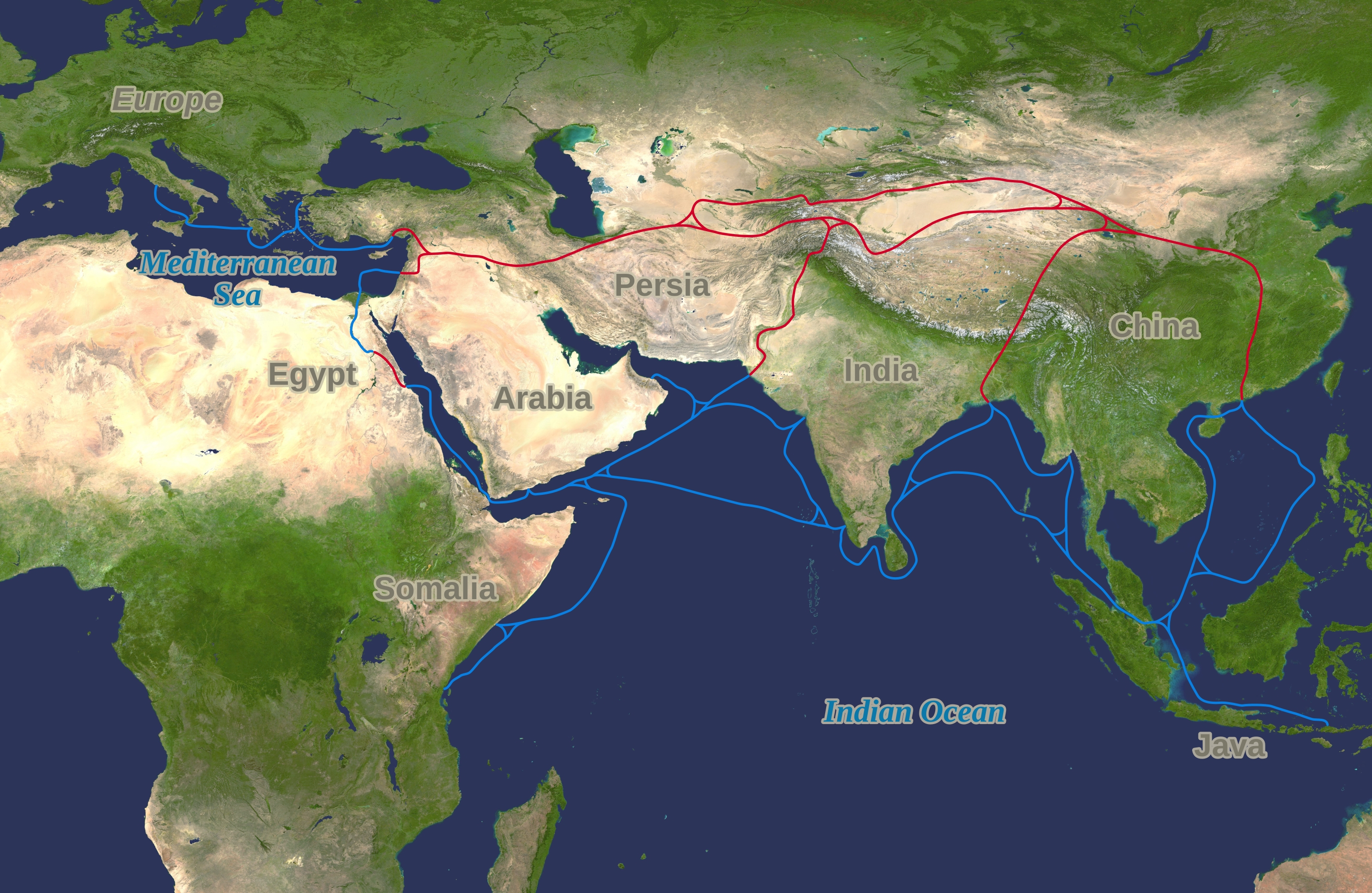
The 11th century World System

Andrey Korotayev claims that the present-day world-system ("the World System"), which in the 2nd millennium CE encompassed the whole globe, originated in the 9th millennium BCE in direct connection with the Neolithic Revolution. According to Korotayev, the centre of this system was originally in West Asia.

In general, Korotayev and his colleagues have suggested a rather novel approach to the world-system analysis. Within this approach the main emphasis is moved to the generation and diffusion of innovations. If a society borrows systematically important technological innovations, its evolution already cannot be considered as really independent, but should rather be considered as a part of a larger evolving entity, within which such innovations are systematically produced and diffused. The main idea of the world-system approach was to find the evolving unit. The basic idea was that it is impossible to account for the evolution of a single society without taking into consideration that it was a part of a larger whole. However, traditional world-system analysis concentrated on bulk-good movements, and core – periphery exploitation, somehow neglecting the above-mentioned dimension. However, according to Korotayev, the information network turns out to be the oldest mechanism of the World System integration, and remained extremely important throughout its whole history, remaining important up to the present. It seems to be even more important than the core – periphery exploitation (for example, without taking this mechanism into consideration it appears impossible to account for such things as the demographic explosion in the 20th century, whose proximate cause was the dramatic decline of mortality, but whose main ultimate cause was the diffusion of innovations produced almost exclusively within the World System core). This also suggests a redefinition of the World System core. Within the approach in question the core is not the World System zone, which exploits other zones, but rather the World System core is the zone with the highest innovation donor/recipient ratio, the principal innovation donor.

Hyperbolic trend of the world population growth

Korotayev suggests that the hyperbolic trend observed for the world population growth after 10000 BCE does appear to be primarily a product of the growth of the World System.Articles from journals The presence of the hyperbolic trend itself indicates that the major part of the entity in question had some systemic unity, and Korotayev insists that the evidence for this unity is readily available. Indeed, he shows that we have evidence for the systematic spread of major innovations (domesticated cereals, cattle, sheep, goats, horses, plow, wheel, copper, bronze, and later iron technology, and so on) throughout the whole North African – Eurasian Oikumene for a few millennia BCE. As a result, the evolution of societies of this part of the world already at this time cannot be regarded as truly independent. By the end of the 1st millennium BCE we observe a belt of cultures, stretching from the Atlantic to the Pacific, with an astonishingly similar level of cultural complexity characterised by agricultural production of wheat and other specific cereals, the breeding of cattle, sheep, and goats; use of the plow, iron metallurgy, and wheeled transport; development of professional armies and cavalries deploying rather similar weapons; elaborate bureaucracies, and Axial Age ideologies, and so on – this list could be extended for pages. A few millennia before, we would find another belt of societies strikingly similar in level and character of cultural complexity, stretching from the Balkans up to the Indus Valley outskirts. Korotayev interprets this as a tangible result of the World System's functioning.

==== Great Divergence and Great Convergence ====
Together with Leonid Grinin he has also made a significant contribution to the current Great Divergence debate. As is noted by Jack Goldstone, the "new view, carefully presented and rigorously modeled by Grinin and Korotayev, provides a richer and more nuanced version of the "Great Divergence," bridging many of the differences between the traditional and California viewpoints. Yet they go further. Amazingly, by building a model using human capital (education), global population growth, and regional productivity, they show how both the Great Divergence and the recent "Great Convergence" (the economic catching up of developing countries) are phases of the same process of global modernisation." In addition, Korotayev's research has revealed a close coupling between phases of global demographic transition and phases of the Great Divergence and Great Convergence.

==== Kondratieff waves ====
A rough schematic drawing showing the "World Economy" over time according to the Kondratiev theory

Note also his research on Kondratiev waves in the world GDP dynamics that, employing spectral analysis, has confirmed their presence at an acceptable level of statistical significance.

He has also detected Kondratieff waves in the global dynamics of invention activities.

==== General theory of social macroevolution ====
In addition, it appears necessary to maintain that Korotayev's theory of the World System development suggests a novel approach to the formation of a general theory of social macroevolution. The approach prevalent in social evolutionism is based on the assumption that evolutionary regularities of simple systems are significantly simpler than the ones characteristic of complex systems. A rather logical outcome of this almost self-evident assumption is that one should first study the evolutionary regularities of simple systems and only after understanding them move to more complex ones, whereas Korotayev's findings suggest that the simplest regularities accounting for extremely large proportions of all the macrovariation can be found precisely for the largest possible system – the human world, and, hence, the study of sociocultural evolution should proceed from the detection of simple regularities of the development of the most complex systems to the study of the complex laws of the dynamics of simple social systems.

=== Cross-cultural studies ===
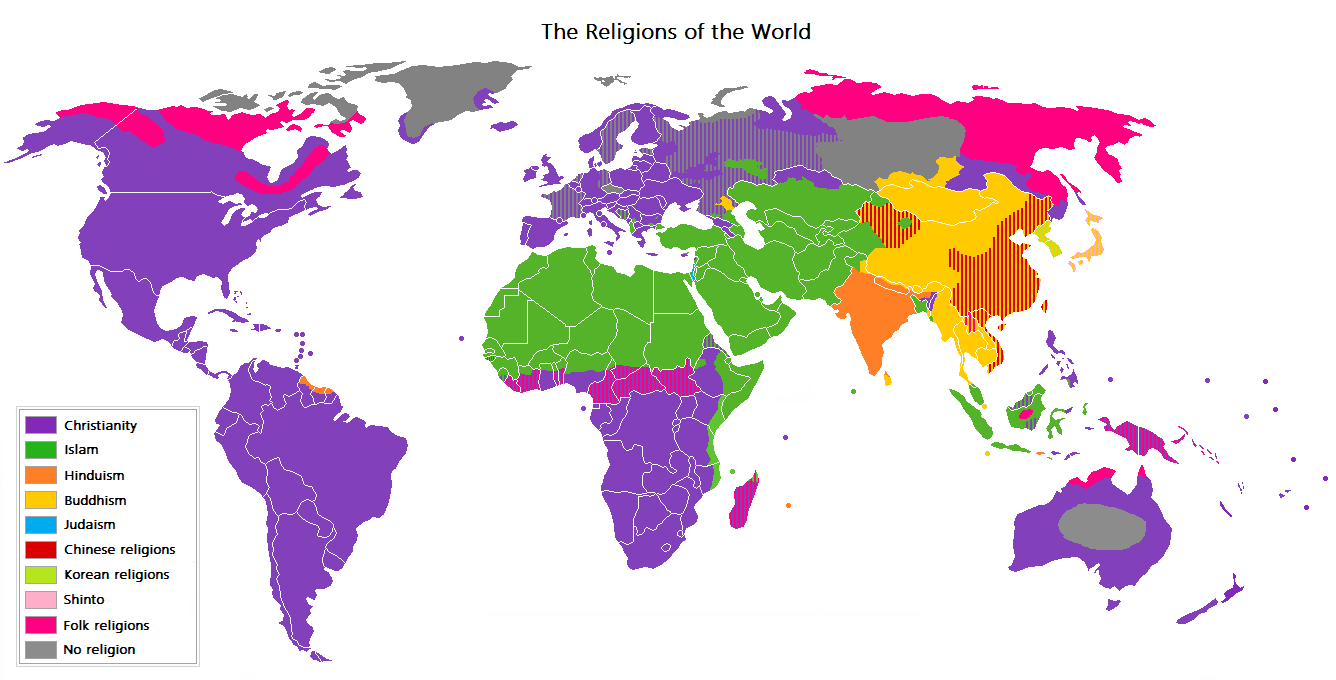
Religions of the world

From a complexity perspective Korotayev's establishes a key point, that of the bifurcations of social and kinship organisation that coalesced historically around the differential practices of the major world religions. It draws on the World Cultural database and the world religion as well as other variables. The Murdockian comparative approach, up to Korotayev, had developed to the point where the nonindependence of cultures was well-recognized, and ways of taking the larger configurations of cultural systems into account had been reckoned to lie, in the latest iteration, along lines of high-order proto-linguistic communities. Korotayev demonstrates the effects of breaking what might be seen as a ritual taboo of Murdockian comparison: Thou Shalt Not Code World Religion. By doing so, Korotayev releases the Murdockian spell that lingers over the comparative approach in anthropology, and goes on to demonstrate the powerful effects of world religious communities — dating from what Jaspers calls the "Axial Age" (800–200 BCE) – on the preservation and differentiation of distinctive social and political structures in Eurasia. His introduction and conclusion suggest that an objectivist natural history approach to human history, in which subjective factors are of local importance but fade out in terms of lasting effects over generations, is a valid approach to the "pre-Axial" condition of human societies, while a subjectivist history of consciousness is a necessary complement to the "post-Axial" condition. Korotayev succeeds in placing these two complementary approaches in context and showing their linkages in terms of how subjective and religious factors play out in human history alongside objective factors such as demography and ecology, each informing the other. He shows how it is impossible to arrive at valid inferential results from comparative approaches without an integration of the two, a situation he aptly calls "Galton's opportunity" for those are of century-old critiques of the comparative method. The reader will be surprised at the depth of empirical comparative findings in this short book. Following Murray Leaf's Man, Mind and Science (1974) this work is a major contribution to repair of the material/ideational rift in anthropology.

==== Matrilocal vs. patrilocal residence ====
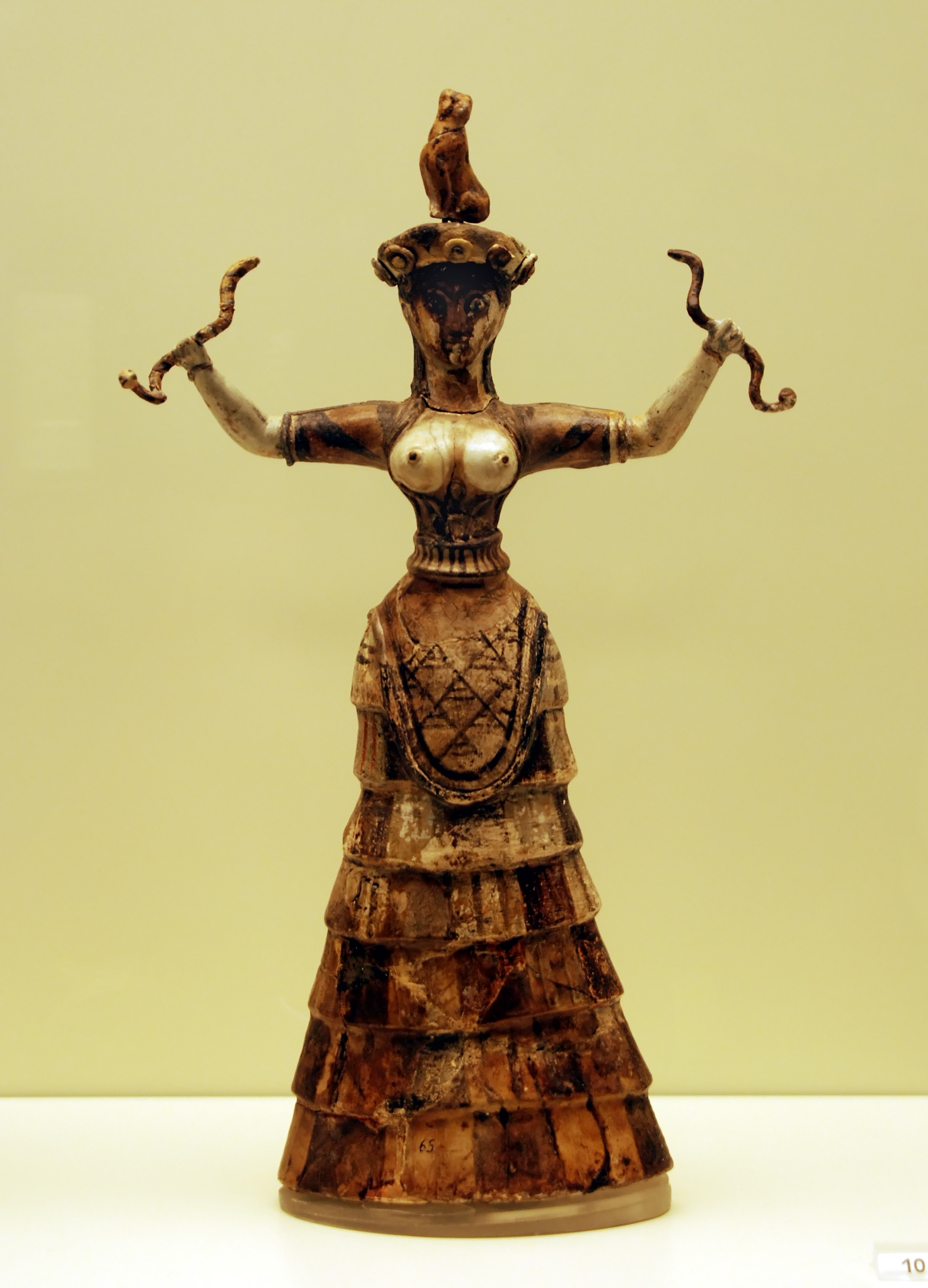
Snake Goddess – Heraklion Archaeological Museum

One of his particular contributions in this field is connected with the classical anthropological issue of determinants of matrilocal versus patrilocal postmarital residence. Early theories explaining the determinants of postmarital residence (e.g., Lewis Henry Morgan, Edward Tylor, or George Peter Murdock) connected it with the sexual division of labour. However, to the moment when Korotayev's research in this field began, cross-cultural tests of this hypothesis using worldwide samples had failed to find any significant relationship between these two variables. Korotayev's tests have shown that the female contribution to subsistence does correlate significantly with matrilocal residence in general; however, this correlation is masked by a general polygyny factor. Although an increase in the female contribution to subsistence tends to lead to matrilocal residence, it also tends simultaneously to lead to general non-sororal polygyny which effectively destroys matrilocality. If this polygyny factor is controlled (e. g., through a multiple regression model), division of labour turns out to be a significant predictor of postmarital residence. Thus, Murdock's hypotheses regarding the relationships between the sexual division of labour and postmarital residence were basically correct, though, as has been shown by Korotayev, the actual relationships between those two groups of variables are more complicated than he expected.

==== Myths, genes, and deep history ====
Korotayev was also one of the pioneers (together with his colleagues) of the study of correlation between spatial distributions of folklore-mythological motifs and genetic markers, as well as linguistic and sociostructural characteristics, and produced in this area significant results with respect to the deep history reconstruction. As is noticed by Julien d'Huy et al., "Korotayev and Khaltourina showed statistical correlation between spatial distributions of mythological motifs and genetic markers, considerably above the 4,000 km... Such correlations allow us to reconstruct in detail the mythology... brought to the New World from South Siberia by three Paleolithic migration waves".

==== Unilineal descent and Christianization ====
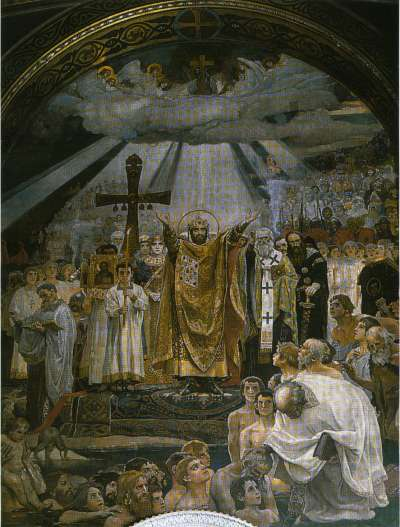
The Baptism of Kievans, a fresco by Viktor Vasnetsov

Korotayev studies variables that are usually regarded as the main causes of the decline of unilineal descent organisation (statehood, class stratification and commercialisation), along with a variable that had never been regarded as such a cause – deep Christianization. He postulates that the traditionally accepted causes of the decline of unilineal descent organisation (statehood, class stratification, commercialisation) are less significant than deep Christianization. He also theorises that the presence of unilineal descent groups correlates negatively with communal democracy and is especially strong for complex traditional societies. Korotayev concludes that, because the communal democracy correlates positively with the supracommunal one, the Christianization of Europe might have contributed to the development of modern democracy by helping to destroy unilineal descent organisation in this region.

=== Sociopolitical systems in the Middle East and Africa ===
==== Origins of parallel-cousin marriage and the Afrasian Instability Zone ====
Islamization, along with an area's inclusion in the 8th-century Arab-Islamic Khalifate (and its persistence within the Islamic world) has been demonstrated by Korotayev to be a strong and significant predictor of parallel cousin (Father's Brother's Daughter – FBD) marriage. He has shown that while there is a clear functional connection between Islam and FBD marriage, the prescription to marry a FBD does not appear to be sufficient to persuade people to actually marry thus, even if the marriage brings with it economic advantages. According to Korotayev, a systematic acceptance of parallel-cousin marriage took place when Islamization occurred together with Arabization. This research further led to the discovery of the so-called Afrasian Instability Zone.

==== Yemeni Studies ====
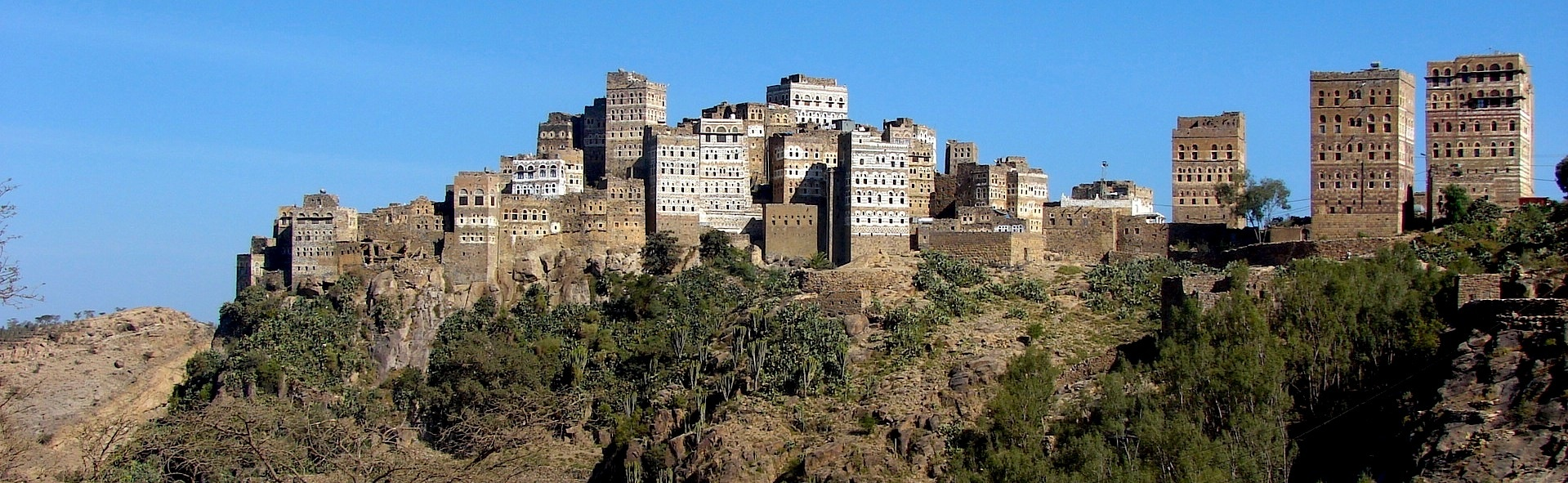
Yemen

Korotayev has made a special contribution in this field by detecting principal trends in the evolution of Yemeni cultures through application of quantitative methods to the analysis of mass epigraphic sources in the Sabaic language. Korotayev has thereby discovered the phenomenon of consolidation of the clan organisation in North-East Yemen in the late 1st millennium BCE as well as the transition from chiefdoms to tribes in early medieval Yemen. He was also the first to provide convincing evidence for the existence of matrilineal descent organisation in Pre-Islamic Arabia and to suggest an adequate translation of the largest Qatabanic inscription, R 3566.

==== African Studies ====
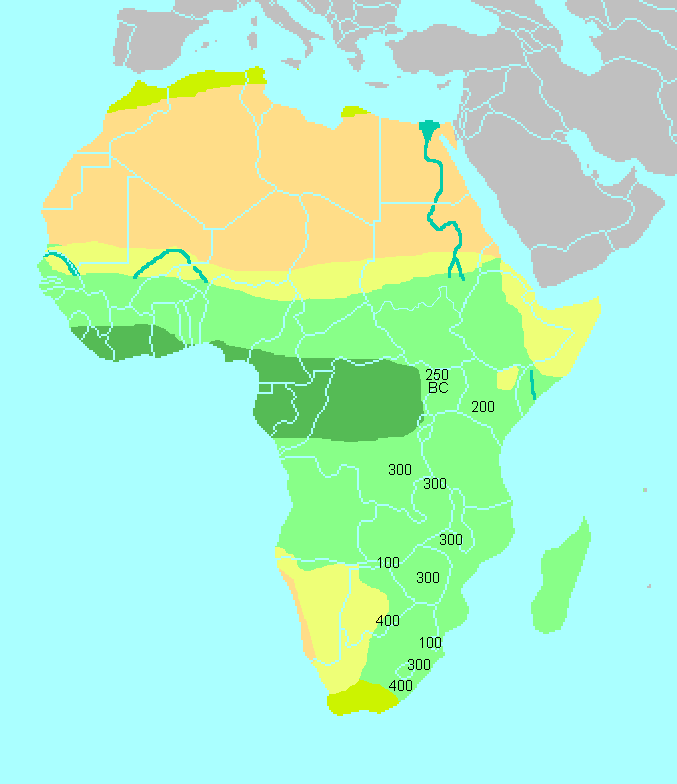
Simplified climatic map of Africa. The numbers shown correspond to the dates of all Iron Age artefacts associated with the Bantu expansion.

Korotayev and his colleagues have also made significant contributions to the study of political-demographic dynamics in Subsaharan Africa, especially, the problems of the Tropical African countries' escape from the Malthusian trap.

==== Origins of Islam ====
Korotayev has also done (together with his colleagues Vladimir Klimenko and Dmitry Proussakov) a significant contribution to the study of the origins of Islam. Korotayev and his colleagues view the origins of Islam against the background of the 6th century Arabian socioecological crisis whose model is specified by Korotayev and his colleagues through the study of climatological, seismological, volcanological and epidemiological history of the period. They find that most sociopolitical systems of the Arabs reacted to the socioecological crisis by getting rid of the rigid supratribal political structures (kingdoms and chiefdoms) which started posing a real threat to their very survival.

The decades of fighting which led to the destruction of most of the Arabian kingdoms and chiefdoms (reflected in Ayyam al-'Arab tradition) led to the elaboration of some definite "antiroyal" freedom-loving tribal ethos. At the beginning of the 7th century a tribe which would recognise themselves as subjects of some terrestrial supratribal political authority, a "king", risked to lose its honour. However, this seems not to be applicable to the authority of another type, the "celestial" one. At the meantime the early 7th century evidences the merging of the Arabian tradition of prophecy and the Arabian Monotheist "Rahmanist" tradition which produced "the Arabian prophetic movement".

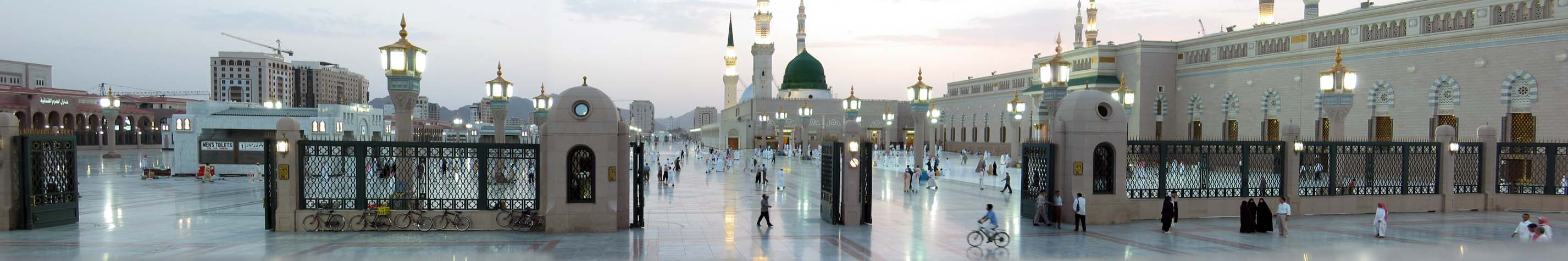
Al-Masjid al-Nabawi (the Mosque of the Prophet) in Medina, Saudi Arabia, is the site of Muhammad's tomb.

According to Korotayev, the Monotheist "Rahmanist" prophets appear to have represented a supratribal authority just of the type many Arab tribes were looking for at this very time, which seems to explain to a certain extent those prophets' political success (including the extreme political success of Muhammad).

== Select publications ==
Korotayev has written over 35 books and 370 articles dealing with his research interests . These include

- Ancient Yemen (Oxford University Press, 1995);
- Pre-Islamic Yemen. Wiesbaden: Harrassowitz, 1996;
- World Religions and Social Evolution of the Old World Oikumene Civilizations: A Cross-cultural Perspective (Edwin Mellen Press, 2004);
- Introduction to Social Macrodynamics. Compact Macromodels of the World System Growth (KomKniga/URSS, 2006, with Artemy Malkov and Daria Khaltourina);
- Introduction to Social Macrodynamics. Secular Cycles and Millennial Trends (KomKniga/URSS, 2006, with Artemy Malkov and Daria Khaltourina);
- Great Divergence and Great Convergence. A Global Perspective (Springer, 2015, with Leonid Grinin).
- Economic Cycles, Crises, and the Global Periphery (Springer, 2016, with Leonid Grinin and Arno Tausch).
- Islamism, Arab Spring, and the Future of Democracy. World System and World Values Perspectives (Springer, 2019, with Leonid Grinin and Arno Tausch)
- Handbook of Revolutions in the 21st Century. The New Waves of Revolutions, and the Causes and Effects of Disruptive Political Change (Springer, 2022).

Among his more important journal articles are

- "Origins of Islam". Acta Orientalia Academiae Scientiarum Hungaricae 53/3–4 (1999): 243–276 (with Vladimir Klimenko and Dmitry Proussakov),
- "Regions Based on Social Structure: A Reconsideration". Current Anthropology 41/5 (October 2000): 668–690 (with Alexander Kazankov),
- Evolutionary Agent-Based Model of Pre-State Warfare Patterns: Cross-Cultural Tests. World Cultures 15/1 (2004): 28–36 (with Mikhail Burtsev).
- A Compact Macromodel of World System Evolution in the Journal of World Systems Research 11/1 (2005): 79–93.
- Return of the White Raven: Postdiluvial Reconnaissance Motif A2234.1.1 Reconsidered. Journal of American Folklore 119 (2006): 472–520.
- The World System Urbanization Dynamics: A quantitative analysis in History & Mathematics: Historical Dynamics and Development of Complex Societies (Ed. by Peter Turchin, Leonid Grinin et al., p. 44–62. Moscow: KomKniga, 2006),
- Social Macroevolution: Growth of the World System Integrity and a System of Phase Transitions. World Futures, Volume 65, Issue 7 October 2009, pages 477–506 (with Leonid Grinin),
- A Spectral Analysis of World GDP Dynamics: Kondratieff Waves, Kuznets Swings, Juglar and Kitchin Cycles in Global Economic Development, and the 2008–2009 Economic Crisis. Structure and Dynamics. 2010. Vol.4. No. 1. P.3-57 (with Sergey Tsirel),
- Log-Periodic Oscillation Analysis Forecasts the Burst of the "Gold Bubble" in April – June 2011 // Structure and Dynamics 4/3 (2010): 1–11 (with Askar Akayev, Alexey Fomin, and Sergey Tsirel),
- Korotayev, Andrey; Zinkina, Julia; Bogevolnov, Justislav (2011). "Kondratieff waves in global invention activity (1900–2008)". Technological Forecasting and Social Change. 78 (7): 1280. doi:10.1016/j.techfore.2011.02.011.
- Egyptian Revolution: A Demographic Structural Analysis. Entelequia. Revista Interdisciplinar 13 (2011): 139–165 (with Julia Zinkina),
- A Trap At The Escape From The Trap? Demographic-Structural Factors of Political Instability in Modern Africa and West Asia. Cliodynamics 2/2 (2011): 276–303 (with Daria Khaltourina and others),
- Malkov, Artemy; Zinkina, Julia; Korotayev, Andrey (2012). "The origins of dragon-kings and their occurrence in society". Physica A: Statistical Mechanics and Its Applications. 391 (21): 5215. Bibcode:2012PhyA..391.5215M. doi:10.1016/j.physa.2012.05.045.
- Globalization Shuffles Cards of the World Pack: In Which Direction is the Global Economic-Political Balance Shifting? World Futures, 70: 515–545, 2014 (with Leonid Grinin).
- Phases of global demographic transition correlate with phases of the Great Divergence and Great Convergence. Technological Forecasting and Social Change. Volume 95, June 2015, Pages 163–169 (with Jack A. Goldstone & Julia Zinkina).
- Effects of specific alcohol control policy measures on alcohol-related mortality in Russia from 1998 to 2013. Alcohol and Alcoholism, 2015, 50(5), 588–601 (with Daria Khaltourina).
- Korotayev, Andrey; Issaev, Leonid; Shishkina, Alisa (2015). "Egyptian coup of 2013: an 'econometric' analysis". The Journal of North African Studies. 21 (3): 341–356. doi:10.1080/13629387.2015.1124238. S2CID 147640479.
- Afrasian Instability Zone and Its Historical Background. Social Evolution & History. 2016. Vol. 15(2). P. 120-140.
- Great Divergence of the 18th century? Cliodynamics 9/2 (2018): 108–123.
- The 21st Century Singularity and its Big History Implications: A re-analysis.Journal of Big History 2/3 (2018): 71 – 118.
- GDP Per Capita and Protest Activity: A Quantitative Reanalysis. Cross-Cultural Research 52/4 (2018): 406–440.
- Economic growth, education, and terrorism: A re-analysis. Terrorism and Political Violence 33/3 (2021): 572–595.
- Education and Revolutions: Why do Revolutionary Uprisings Take Violent or Nonviolent Forms?. Cross-Cultural Research, 2023, 10693971231162231.
- The Fifth Generation of Revolution Studies. Part I: When, Why and How Did It Emerge. Critical Sociology. 2025, 51(2): 257–282. DOI: 10.1177/08969205241300596

== Edited volumes by Andrey Korotayev ==
- Complexity in Universal Evolution. A Big History Perspective (Springer Nature, 2026).
- Navigating Complexity in Big History. Exploring Periodization Across Cosmic and Biosocial Dimensions (Springer Nature, 2025).
- Terrorism and Political Contention. New Perspectives on North Africa and the Sahel Region (Springer, 2024).
- Handbook of Revolutions in the 21st Century. The New Waves of Revolutions, and the Causes and Effects of Disruptive Political Change (Springer, 2022).
- New Wave of Revolutions in the MENA Region. A Comparative Perspective (2022).
- The 21st Century Singularity and Global Futures. A Big History Perspective (Springer, 2020)
- History & Mathematics: Big History Aspects (2019).
- Evolution: Evolutionary Trends, Aspects, and Patterns (2019).
- Globalistics and Globalization Studies: Global Evolution, Historical Globalistics and Globalization Studies (2017)
- History & Mathematics: Economy, Demography, Culture, and Cosmic Civilizations (2017).
- Political Demography & Global Ageing (2015).
- Evolution: From Big Bang to Nanorobots. Moscow: Uchitel, 2015.
- Trends and Cycles, Keldysh Institute of Applied Mathematics, 2014.
- Teaching & Researching Big History: Exploring a New Scholarly Field, International Big History Association, 2014.
- Kondratieff Waves: Dimensions and Prospects at the Dawn of the 21st Century. Volgograd: Uchitel, 2012. <co-editor, with Leonid Grinin and Tessaleno Devezas; in English>
- Evolution: A Big History Perspective. Volgograd: 'Uchitel' Publishing House, 2011. ISBN 978-5-7057-2905-0 <co-editor, with Leonid Grinin and Barry Rodrigue; in English>.
- Evolution: Cosmic, Biological, and Social / Edited by L. E. Grinin, R. L. Carneiro, A. V. Korotayev, F. Spier. Volgograd, Uchitel 2011.
- Forecasting and Modeling of Crises and World Dynamics. Moscow: LKI/URSS, 2010 <co-editor, with Askar Akayev and Georgy Malinetsky; in Russian>.
- System Monitoring of Global and Regional Risks. Moscow: LKI/URSS, 2010 <co-editor; in Russian>.
- Evolution: Problems and Discussions. Moscow: LKI/URSS, 2010 <co-editor; in Russian>.
- History and Mathematics. Evolutionary Historical Macrodynamics. Moscow: LIBROCOM/URSS, 2010 <co-editor; in Russian>.
- Causes of the Russian Revolution. Moscow: LKI/URSS, 2010 <co-editor; in Russian>.
- System Monitoring. Global and Regional Development. Moscow: LIBROCOM /URSS, 2010 <co-editor; in Russian>.
- History and Mathematics. Processes and Models. М.: URSS, 2009 <co-editor; in Russian>.
- Hierarchy and Power in the History of Civilizations: Political Aspects of Modernity / Ed. by L. E. Grinin, D. D. Beliaev, A. V. Korotayev. Moscow: LIBROCOM/URSS, 2008 <co-editor; in English>.
- Hierarchy and Power in the History of Civilizations: Ancient and Medieval Cultures/ Ed. by L. E. Grinin, D. D. Beliaev, A. V. Korotayev. Moscow: LIBROCOM/URSS, 2008 <co-editor; in English>.
- Problems of Mathematical History. Historical Reconstruction, Forecasting, Methodology. М.: LIBROCOM /URSS, 2008 <co-editor; in Russian>.
- Problems of Mathematical History. Mathematical Modeling of Historical Processes. М.: LIBROCOM /URSS, 2008 <co-editor; in Russian>.
- Problems of Mathematical History. Basics, Information Resources, Data Analysis. М.: LIBROCOM /URSS, 2008. С. 235–245 <co-editor; in Russian>.
- History and Mathematics. Models and Theories. Moscow: LKI/URSS, 2008 <co-editor; in Russian>.
- Alcohol Catastrophe. Moscow: LENAND/URSS, 2008 <co-editor; in Russian>.
- Interethnic Relations in Contemporary Tanzania. The 2005 Field Season of the Russian Multidisciplinary Expedition in the United Republic of Tanzania. Moscow: Institute for African Studies, Russian Academy of Sciences, 2007 <co-editor; in Russian>.
- History & Mathematics: Analyzing and Modeling Global Development. Moscow: URSS, 2006 <co-editor; in English>.
- History & Mathematics: Historical Dynamics and Development of Complex Societies. Moscow: URSS, 2006 <co-editor; in English>.
- History and Complexity Studies: Mathematical Modeling of Social Dynamics. Moscow: URSS, 2005 <co-editor; in Russian>.
- The Early State, Its Alternatives and Analogues. Volgograd: Uchitel, 2004 <co-editor; in Russian>.
- The Moscow School of Quantitative Cross-Cultural Research. Thousand Oaks, CA: SAGE, 2003 (Cross-Cultural Research 37/1) <co-editor; in English>.
- Alternatives of Social Evolution. Vladivostok: Dal'nauka, 2000 <co-editor; in English>.
- Civilizational Models of Politogenesis. Moscow: Inst. for Afr. Stud. Press, 2000 <co-editor; in English>.
- Alternatives Pathways to Civilization. Moscow: Logos, 2000 <co-editor; in Russian>.
- Sociobiology of Ritual and Group Identity: A Homology of Animal and Human Behaviour. Moscow: Russian State University for Humanities, 1998 <co-editor; in English>.
- Alternativity of History. Donetsk: Donetskoe Otdelenie SAMI, 1992 <co-editor; in Russian>.
- Archaic Society: Key Problems of Evolutionary Sociology. Moscow: Institut istorii SSSR AN SSSR, 1991 <co-editor; in Russian>.
