= Hyperbolic growth =

Growth function exhibiting a singularity at a finite time

The reciprocal function, exhibiting hyperbolic growth.

When a quantity grows towards a singularity under a finite variation (a "finite-time singularity") it is said to undergo hyperbolic growth. More precisely, the reciprocal function $1/x$ has a hyperbola as a graph, and has a singularity at 0, meaning that the limit as $x \to 0$ is infinite: any similar graph is said to exhibit hyperbolic growth.

== Description ==
If the output of a function is inversely proportional to its input, or inversely proportional to the difference from a given value $x_0$, the function will exhibit hyperbolic growth, with a singularity at $x_0$.

In the real world hyperbolic growth is created by certain non-linear positive feedback mechanisms.

=== Comparisons with other growth functions ===
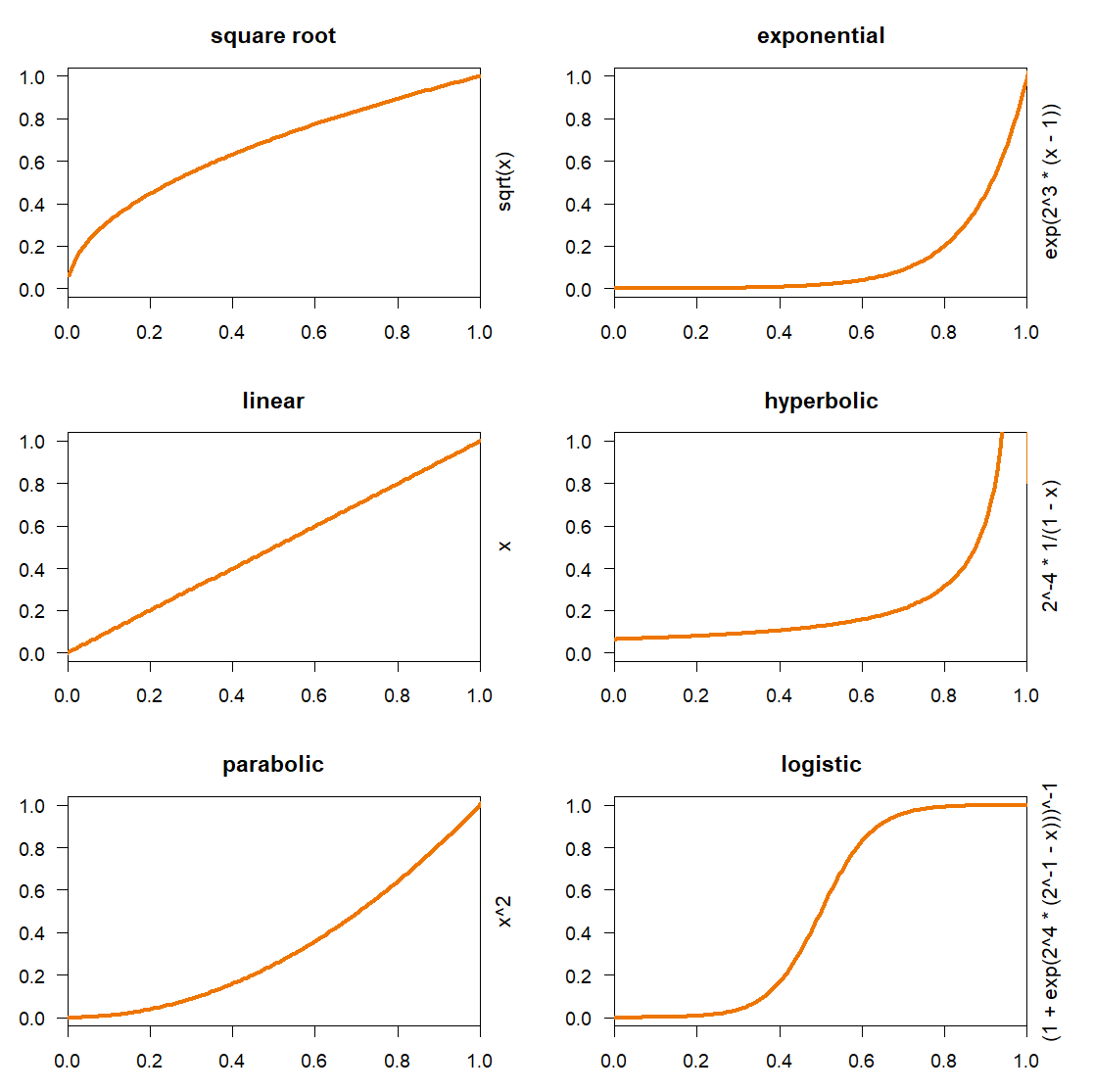
Growth equations

Like exponential growth and logistic growth, hyperbolic growth is highly nonlinear, but differs in important respects. These functions can be confused, as exponential growth, hyperbolic growth, and the first half of logistic growth are convex functions; however their asymptotic behavior (behavior as input gets large) differs dramatically:

- logistic growth is constrained (has a finite limit, even as time goes to infinity),
- exponential growth grows to infinity as time goes to infinity (but is always finite for finite time),
- hyperbolic growth has a singularity in finite time (grows to infinity at a finite time).

== Applications ==
=== Population ===
Certain mathematical models suggest that until the early 1970s the world population underwent hyperbolic growth (see, e.g., Introduction to Social Macrodynamics by Andrey Korotayev et al.). It was also shown that until the 1970s the hyperbolic growth of the world population was accompanied by quadratic-hyperbolic growth of the world GDP, and developed a number of mathematical models describing both this phenomenon, and the World System withdrawal from the blow-up regime observed in the recent decades. The hyperbolic growth of the world population and quadratic-hyperbolic growth of the world GDP observed till the 1970s have been correlated by Andrey Korotayev and his colleagues to a non-linear second order positive feedback between the demographic growth and technological development, described by a chain of causation: technological growth leads to more carrying capacity of land for people, which leads to more people, which leads to more inventors, which in turn leads to yet more technological growth, and on and on. It has been also demonstrated that the hyperbolic models of this type may be used to describe in a rather accurate way the overall growth of the planetary complexity of the Earth since 4 billion BC up to the present. Other models suggest exponential growth, logistic growth, or other functions.

=== Queuing theory ===
Another example of hyperbolic growth can be found in queueing theory: the average waiting time of randomly arriving customers grows hyperbolically as a function of the average load ratio of the server. The singularity in this case occurs when the average amount of work arriving to the server equals the server's processing capacity. If the processing needs exceed the server's capacity, then there is no well-defined average waiting time, as the queue can grow without bound. A practical implication of this particular example is that for highly loaded queuing systems the average waiting time can be extremely sensitive to the processing capacity.

=== Enzyme kinetics ===
A further practical example of hyperbolic growth can be found in enzyme kinetics. When the rate of reaction (termed velocity) between an enzyme and substrate is plotted against various concentrations of the substrate, a hyperbolic plot is obtained for many simpler systems. When this happens, the enzyme is said to follow Michaelis-Menten kinetics.

== Mathematical example ==
The function

$$x(t)=\frac{1}{t_c-t}$$

exhibits hyperbolic growth with a singularity at time $t_c$: in the limit as $t \to t_c$, the function goes to infinity.

More generally, the function

$$x(t)=\frac{K}{t_c-t}$$

exhibits hyperbolic growth, where $K$ is a scale factor.

Note that this algebraic function can be regarded as analytical solution for the function's differential:

$$\frac{dx}{dt} = \frac{K}{(t_c-t)^2} = \frac{x^2}{K}$$

This means that with hyperbolic growth the absolute growth rate of the variable x in the moment t is proportional to the square of the value of x in the moment t.

Respectively, the quadratic-hyperbolic function looks as follows:

$$x(t)=\frac{K}{(t_c-t)^2}.$$

== See also ==
- Exponential growth
- Logistic growth
- Mathematical singularity
