= Daria Khaltourina =

Sociologist and anthropologist

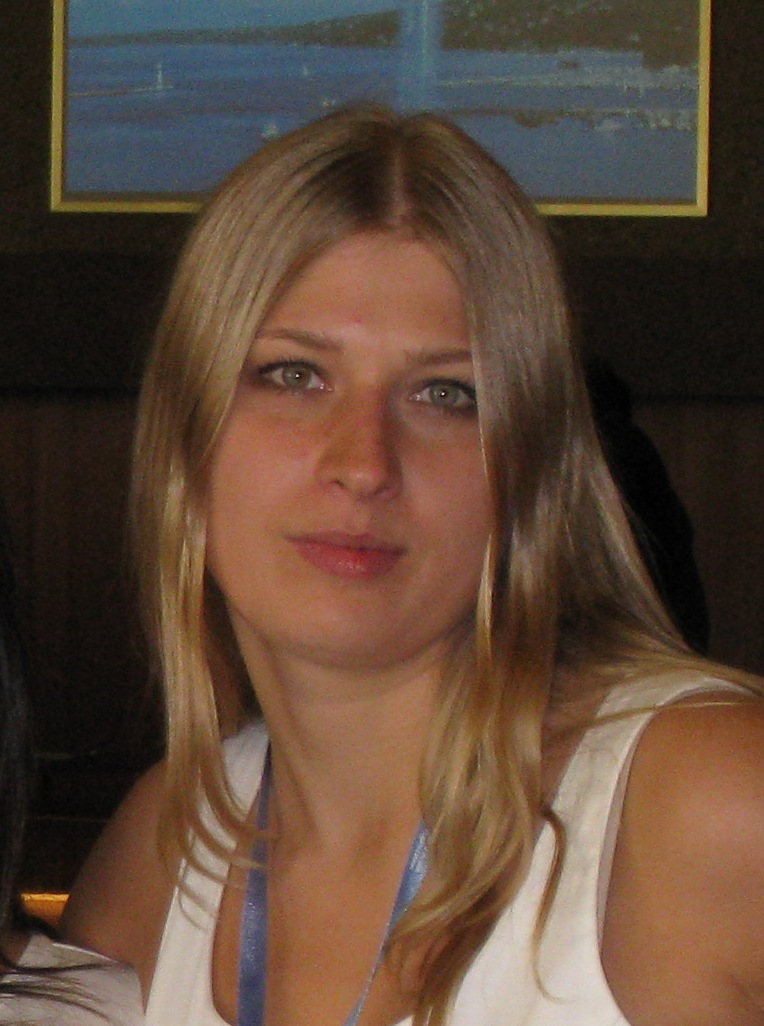
Daria Khaltourina in 2009

Daria Andreyevna Khaltourina (Russian: Дáрья Андрéевна Халтýрина; born 4 January 1979 in Chelyabinsk) is a Russian sociologist, anthropologist, demographer, and a public figure. She is the head of the Group of the Monitoring of Global and Regional Risks of the Russian Academy of Sciences, co-chairperson of the Russian Coalition for Alcohol Control, as well as the Russian Coalition for Tobacco Control. She is a laureate of the Russian Science Support Foundation Award in "The Best Economists of the Russian Academy of Sciences" nomination (2006).

== Mathematical modeling of global dynamics ==
In this field she has proposed one of the most convincing mathematical explanations for von Foerster's Doomsday Equation. In collaboration with her colleagues, Artemy Malkov and Andrey Korotayev, she has shown that till the 1970s the hyperbolic growth of the world population was accompanied by quadratic-hyperbolic growth of the world GDP, and developed a number of mathematical models describing both this phenomenon, and the World System withdrawal from the blow-up regime observed in the recent decades. The hyperbolic growth of the world population and quadratic-hyperbolic growth of the world GDP observed till the 1970s have been correlated by him and his colleagues to a non-linear second order positive feedback between the demographic growth and technological development that can be spelled out as follows: technological growth – increase in the carrying capacity of land for people – demographic growth – more people – more potential inventors – acceleration of technological growth – accelerating growth of the carrying capacity – the faster population growth – accelerating growth of the number of potential inventors – faster technological growth – hence, the faster growth of the Earth's carrying capacity for people, and so on.

== Russian demographic crisis ==
"Russian Cross"; the black curve reflects the death rate dynamics, the red one corresponds to the birth rate (per thousand)

In collaboration with Andrey Korotayev she has made a significant contribution to the study of the factors of the current Russian demographic crisis. They have demonstrated that post-Soviet Russia experiences one of the world's highest prevalence of alcohol-related problems, which contributes to high mortality rates in this region. Reduction in alcohol-related problems in Russia can have strong effects on mortality decline. They have analyzed the plausibility of application of general principles of alcohol policy translated in the Russian Federation. Khaltourina has shown that alcohol policy approaches could be implemented in the same ways as they have been in other countries. In addition, according to Khaltourina, there should be special attention to decreasing distilled spirits consumption, illegal alcohol production, nonbeverage alcohol consumption, and enforcement of current governmental regulations. In late 2014 they correctly predicted the growth of mortality in Russia to start in early 2015.

== Myths, genes, and deep history ==
Khaltourina was also one of the pioneers (together with Andrey Korotayev) of the study of correlation between spatial distributions of folklore-mythological motifs and genetic markers, as well as linguistic and sociostructural characteristics, and produced in this area significant results with respect to the deep history reconstruction. As is noticed by Julien d'Huy et al., "Korotayev and Khaltourina showed statistical correlation between spatial distributions of mythological motifs and genetic markers, considerably above the 4,000 km... Such correlations allow us to reconstruct in detail the mythology... brought to the New World from South Siberia by three Paleolithic migration waves".

== Literacy and the Spirit of Capitalism ==
Khaltourina and her colleagues have demonstrated that Protestantism has indeed influenced positively the capitalist development of respective social systems not so much through the "Protestant ethics" (as was suggested by Max Weber) but rather through the promotion of literacy.

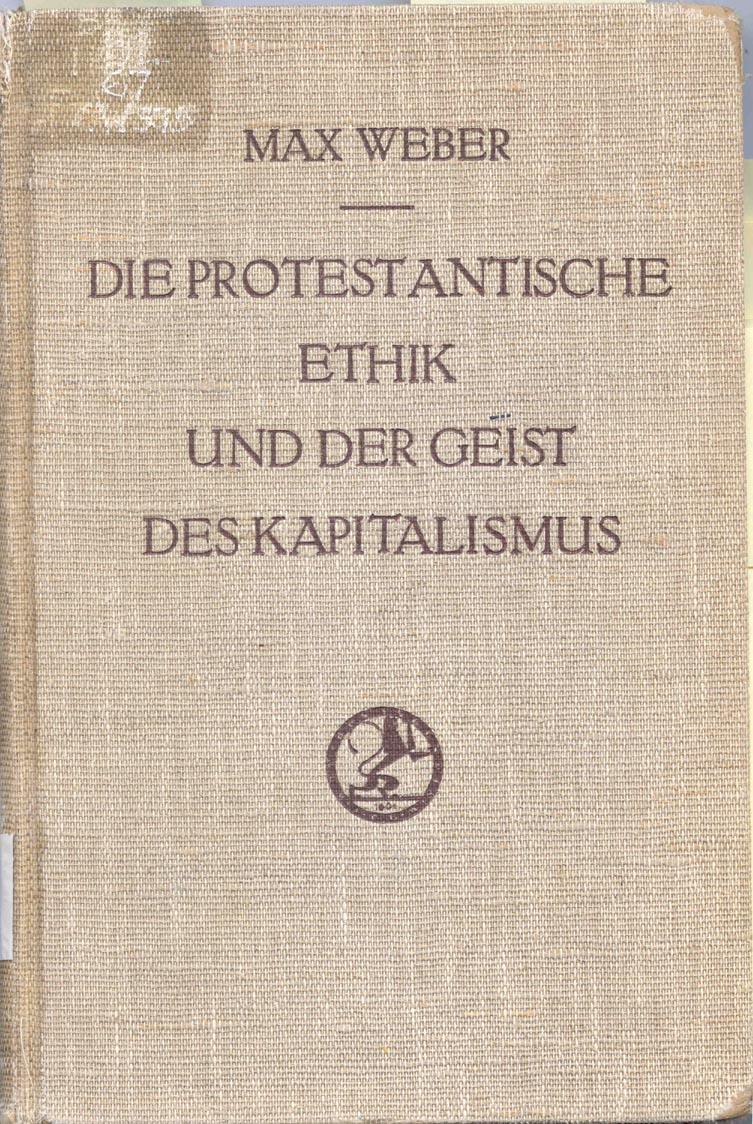

They draw attention to the fact that the ability to read was essential for Protestants (unlike Catholics) to perform their religious duty − to read the Bible. The reading of Holy Scripture was not necessary for Catholic laymen. The edict of the Toulouse Synod (1229) prohibited the Catholic laymen from possessing copies of the Bible. Soon after that, a decision by the Tarragon Synod spread this prohibition to ecclesiastic people as well. In 1408, the Oxford Synod absolutely prohibited translations of the Holy Scripture. From the very beginning, Protestant groups did not accept this prohibition. Thus, Luther translated in 1522–1534 first the New Testament, and then the Old Testament, into German, so that any German-speaking person could read the Holy Scripture in his or her native language. Moreover, the Protestants viewed reading the Holy Scripture as a religious duty of any Christian. As a result, the level of literacy and education was, in general, higher for Protestants than it was for Catholics and for followers of other confessions that did not provide religious stimuli for learning literacy. It has been shown that literate populations have many more opportunities to obtain and utilize the achievements of modernization than illiterate ones. On the other hand, literate people could be characterized by a greater innovative-activity level, which provides opportunities for modernization, development, and economic growth. Empirical tests performed by Korotayev and his colleagues have confirmed the presence of a rather strong and highly significant correlation between the early introduction of mass literacy and subsequent high rates of capitalist economic development.

== Select publications ==
She has authored over 120 scholarly publications. These include

- Introduction to Social Macrodynamics (KomKniga/URSS, 2006, with Andrey Korotayev and Artemy Malkov).
- Халтурина Д. А., Коротаев А. В. Русский крест: Факторы, механизмы и пути преодоления демографического кризиса в России. — М.: КомКнига/URSS, 2006.
- Халтурина Д. А. Мусульмане Москвы. Факторы религиозной толерантности (по материалам опроса в мечетях). — М.: ЦЦРИ РАН, 2007. ISBN 978-5-91298-015-2

Among her more important articles are

- "Concepts of Culture in Cross-National and Cross-Cultural Perspectives" (World Cultures 12, 2001)
- "Methods of Cross-Cultural Research and Modern Anthropology" (Etnograficheskoe Obozrenie 5, 2002)
- Daria Khaltourina, Andrey Korotayev & William Divale. "A Corrected Version of the Standard Cross-Cultural Sample Database" (World Cultures 13/1, 2002)
- Russian Demographic Crisis in Cross-National Perspective. Russia and Globalization: Identity, Security, and Society in an Era of Change. Ed. by D. W. Blum. Baltimore, MD: Johns Hopkins University Press, 2008. P. 37–78
- Khaltourina, D. A., & Korotayev, A. V. 'Potential for alcohol policy to decrease the mortality crisis in Russia', Evaluation & the Health Professions, vol. 31, no. 3, Sep 2008. pp. 272–281
- A Trap At The Escape From The Trap? Demographic-Structural Factors of Political Instability in Modern Africa and West Asia. Cliodynamics 2/2 (2011): 1–28 (with Andrey Korotayev and others).
- Khaltourina, Daria, and Andrey Korotayev "Effects of Specific Alcohol Control Policy Measures on Alcohol-Related Mortality in Russia from 1998 to 2013." Alcohol and Alcoholism 50/5 (2015): 588–601.
- Distilled spirits overconsumption as the most important factor of excessive adult male mortality in Europe. Alcohol and Alcoholism, 53(6) (2018), 742–752.
