= Largest-scale trends in evolution =

Limits of increased complexity over time

The history of life on Earth seems to show a clear trend; for example, it seems intuitive that there is a trend towards increasing complexity in living organisms. More recently evolved organisms, such as mammals, appear to be much more complex than organisms, such as bacteria, which have existed for a much longer period of time. However, there are theoretical and empirical problems with this claim. From a theoretical perspective, it appears that there is no reason to expect evolution to result in any largest-scale trends, although small-scale trends, limited in time and space, are expected (Gould, 1997). From an empirical perspective, it is difficult to measure complexity and, when it has been measured, the evidence does not support a largest-scale trend (McShea, 1996).

== History ==
Many of the founding figures of evolution supported the idea of Evolutionary progress which has fallen from favour, but the work of Francisco J. Ayala and Michael Ruse suggests is still influential.

== Hypothetical largest-scale trends ==
McShea (1998) discusses eight features of organisms that might indicate largest-scale trends in evolution: entropy, energy intensiveness, evolutionary versatility, developmental depth, structural depth, adaptedness, size, complexity. He calls these "live hypotheses", meaning that trends in these features are currently being considered by evolutionary biologists. McShea observes that the most popular hypothesis, among scientists, is that there is a largest-scale trend towards increasing complexity.

Evolutionary theorists agree that there are local trends in evolution, such as increasing brain size in hominids, but these directional changes do not persist indefinitely, and trends in opposite directions also occur (Gould, 1997). Evolution causes organisms to adapt to their local environment; when the environment changes, the direction of the trend may change. The question of whether there is evolutionary progress is better formulated as the question of whether there are any largest-scale trends in evolution (McShea, 1998). That is, is there a consistent directional change throughout the history of life on Earth?

== Theoretical perspective ==
Organisms adapt to their local environment. As long as the local environment is stable, we can expect to observe small-scale trends, as organisms become increasingly adapted to the local environment. Gould (1997) argues that there are no global (largest-scale) trends in evolution, because traits that are advantageous for some local environment are detrimental for some other local environment.

Although it is difficult to measure complexity, it seems uncontroversial that mammals are more complex than bacteria. Gould (1997) agrees, but claims that this apparent largest-scale trend is a statistical artifact. Bacteria represent a minimum level of complexity for life on Earth today. Gould (1997) argues that there is no selective pressure for higher levels of complexity, but there is selective pressure against complexity below the level of bacteria. This minimum required level of complexity, combined with random mutation, implies that the average level of complexity of life must increase over time. Gould (1997) uses the analogy of a random walk that begins near a wall. Although the walk is random, the walker cannot pass through the wall, so we should expect the walker to move increasingly further from the wall as time passes. This does not imply that the walker is driven away from the wall. The wall is analogous to the complexity level of bacteria. We should expect evolution to wander increasingly further from this level of complexity, but it does not imply that evolution is driven towards increasing complexity.

In response to Gould's (1997) critique, Turney (2000) presents a computational model in which there is a largest-scale trend towards increasing evolutionary versatility. This trend requires continual change. Although this model shows that largest-scale trends are compatible with evolutionary theory, the model has not yet been empirically confirmed.

== Empirical perspective ==
Evolutionary theory might not predict largest-scale trends, but there may be such trends nonetheless. McShea (1996) looks at the empirical evidence for a trend towards increasing complexity in Metazoan fossils. He concludes that the evidence is not decisive and further investigation is required.

== See also ==
- Orthogenesis
- Wonderful Life (book)
