= Sofia Miliband =

Soviet Russian Orientalist and bibliographer (1922–2017)

Sofia Davidovna Miliband (Russian: Софья Давидовна Милибанд; 17 July 1922, Moscow – 12 February 2017, Moscow) was a Russian Orientalist and Iranist, author, Doctor of Sciences of history and bibliography.

She was born to David Osipovich Miliband and his wife. Her ancestor Mikhl was a cantonist in Tallinn, while other ancestors lived at Warsaw.

She graduated from the oriental studies department of the MSU Faculty of History and became a research fellow at the Institute of Oriental Studies of the Russian Academy of Sciences working as an Iranist.

She is a second cousin of British Labour Party politicians, David and Ed Miliband.

== Publications ==
- Биобиблиографический словарь советских востоковедов (Biobibliographic Dictionary of Soviet Orientalists). Moscow: Nauka, 1975. — 734 pages.
- Биобиблиографический словарь отечественных востоковедов: с 1917 г. (Biobibliographic Dictionary of Domestic Orientalists: from 1917). Moscow: Nauka, 1995. — 763 pages.
- Востоковеды России, XX — начало XXI века: биобиблиографический словарь (Russian orientalists of the 20th and Early 21st Centuries: A Biobibliographic Dictionary). 2 Vol. Moscow. Восточная литература. 2008. ISBN 978-5-02-036364-9
  - Vol. 1: А — М. — 2008. — 968 pages. ISBN 978-5-02-036364-9
  - Vol. 2: Н — Я. — 2008. — 1004 pages. ISBN 978-5-02-036368-7
  - Востоковеды России, XX-начало XXI века. Дополнения и указатель (Russian Orientalists of the 20th and Early 21st Centuries: Addenda and Indices). Moscow: Восточная литература, 2009. — 70, [1] с. ISBN 978-5-02-036395-3
