= Harvey Whitehouse =

English anthropologist

- Born: 1964 (age 61–62); London, UK
- Scientific career
- Fields: Social anthropology, history, archaeology, cognitive psychology, cultural anthropology, cultural psychology, social psychology
- Workplaces: London School of Economics, University of Cambridge, Queen's University Belfast, University of Oxford
- Website: http://www.harveywhitehouse.com/

Harvey Whitehouse is chair of social anthropology and professorial fellow of Magdalen College at the University of Oxford.

== Education and early career ==
Whitehouse received his B.A. degree in social anthropology from the London School of Economics in 1985. He completed his PhD in anthropology at the University of Cambridge in 1990.

Whitehouse is generally regarded as one of the founders of the cognitive science of religion field. After carrying out two years of field research on a 'cargo cult' in New Britain, Papua New Guinea, in the late 1980s, he developed a theory of "modes of religiosity" that has been the subject of extensive critical evaluation and testing by social anthropologists, historians, archaeologists, and sociologists.

The theory of modes of religiosity seeks to explain the role of ritual in processes of group bonding and in the evolution of social complexity. Two modes are distinguished: imagistic and doctrinal. In the imagistic mode, collective rituals are infrequent and highly emotional, giving rise to tightknit local groups. In the doctrinal mode, rituals are frequent and relatively tame, producing indefinitely expandable communities with standardized beliefs and practices.

Whitehouse's published corpus includes a trilogy of books outlining his theory on modes of religiosity and the dysphoric pathway to identity fusion.

== Later research and career ==
Since the turn of the millennium, Whitehouse has focused increasingly on developing trans-disciplinary collaborations using methods as diverse as ethnographic fieldwork, experiments, interviews, and surveys in lab, field, and online settings, database construction, semantic network analysis, and other methods. In the process, Whitehouse's research programme has gradually expanded beyond religion to examine the role of rituals of all kinds in binding groups together and motivating inter-group competition, including warfare. Together with John Alderdice, Scott Atran, and Richard Davis, Whitehouse is a founding fellow of Oxford's Centre for the Resolution of Intractable Conflict at Harris Manchester College. He is also a founding editor of Seshat: Global History Databank, together with Peter Turchin and Pieter Francois. Whitehouse's other long-term collaborators include Quentin Atkinson, Amy Bogaard, Michael Buhrmester, Thomas Currie, Michael Hochberg, Ian Hodder, Jonathan Jong, Jonathan Lanman, Cristine Legare, Ryan McKay, and William B. Swann.

Whitehouse was founding director of the Institute of Cognition and Culture (Queen's University Belfast) and the Centre for Anthropology and Mind (University of Oxford). While Head of the School of Anthropology at the University of Oxford (2006-2009) he established the Institute of Cognitive and Evolutionary Anthropology. Whitehouse has been principal investigator on several large collaborative initiatives including: the Explaining Religion project, funded by the European Commission, the Ritual, Community and Conflict project funded by the UK's Economic and Social Research Council, and the Ritual Modes project funded by an Advanced Grant from the European Research Council.

== Selected publications ==
- Whitehouse, H. (1995). Inside the cult : religious innovation and transmission in Papua New Guinea. Oxford: Clarendon Press. ISBN 0198279817.
- Whitehouse, H. (2000). Arguments and icons : divergent modes of religiosity. Oxford: Oxford University Press. ISBN 0198234155. OCLC 43083393.
- Whitehouse, H. (2004). Modes of religiosity : a cognitive theory of religious transmission. Walnut Creek, CA: AltaMira Press. ISBN 0759106150. OCLC 53231221.
- Whitehouse, H. & Laidlaw, J. (2004). Ritual and memory : toward a comparative anthropology of religion. Walnut Creek, CA: AltaMira Press. ISBN 9780759106161. OCLC 54365082.
- Whitehouse, H. (2005). Mind and Religion : Psychological and Cognitive Foundations of Religion. AltaMira Press. ISBN 9780759114838. OCLC 856869641.
- Whitehouse, H., & Hodder, I. (2010). Modes of religiosity at Çatalhöyük. In Religion in the emergence of civilization: Çatalhöyük as a case study (pp. 122–145). Cambridge University Press, Cambridge.
- Atkinson, Q. & Whitehouse, H. (2011). "The cultural morphospace of ritual form". Evolution and Human Behavior. 32 (1): 50–62. doi:10.1016/j.evolhumbehav.2010.09.002.
- Whitehouse, H. & Lanman, J. (2014). "The Ties That Bind Us: Ritual, Fusion, and Identification". Current Anthropology. 55 (6): 674–695. doi:10.1086/678698.
- Whitehouse, H., McQuinn, B., Buhrmester, M., & Swann, W. (2014). "Brothers in arms: Libyan revolutionaries bond like family". Proceedings of the National Academy of Sciences. 111 (50): 17783–17785. ISSN 0027-8424. PMID 25385591. doi:10.1073/pnas.1416284111.
- McKay, Ryan; Whitehouse, Harvey (2014). "Religion and Morality". Psychological Bulletin. 141 (2): 447–73. doi:10.1037/a0038455. PMC 4345965. PMID 25528346.
- Whitehouse, H., François, P., & Turchin, P. (2015). "The Role of Ritual in the Evolution of Social Complexity: Five Predictions and a Drum Roll". Cliodynamics: The Journal of Quantitative History and Cultural Evolution. 6 (2). ISSN 2373-7530. doi:10.21237/c7clio6229624.
- Whitehouse, H., Jong, J., Buhrmester, M., Gómez, Á., Bastian, B.; Kavanagh, C., Newson, M., Matthews, M., & Lanman, J. (2017). "The evolution of extreme cooperation via shared dysphoric experiences". Scientific Reports. 7. ISSN 2045-2322. doi:10.1038/srep44292.
- Whitehouse, H. (2024). Inheritance: The Evolutionary Origins of the Modern World. Belknap Press. ISBN 9780674291621.

== See also ==
- Cognitive science of religion
- Social Anthropology
- Evolution Institute
- Evolutionary Psychology
- Evolutionary psychology of religion
- Evolutionary origin of religions
- Cognitive science
- Cultural transmission
- Religion and ritual
- Papua New Guinea
- Seshat: Global History Databank
