= Historical dynamics =

Historical dynamics broadly includes the scientific modeling of history. This might also be termed computer modeling of history, historical simulation, or simulation of history - allowing for an extensive range of techniques in simulation and estimation. Historical dynamics does not exist as a separate science, but there are individual efforts such as long range planning, population modeling, economic forecasting, demographics, global modeling, country modeling, regional planning, urban planning and many others in the general categories of computer modeling, planning, forecasting, and simulations.

Some examples of "large" history where historical dynamics simulations would be helpful include; global history, large structures, histories of empires, long duration history, philosophy of history, Eurasian history, comparative history, long-range environmental history, world systems theory, non-Western political and economic development, and historical demography.

== Information sources for simulations ==
With the rise of technologies like wikis, and internet-wide search engines, some historical and social data can be mined to constrain models of history and society. Data from social media sites, and busy sites, can be mined for human patterns of action. These can provide more and more realistic behavioral models for individuals and groups of any size. Agent-based models and microsimulations of human behavior can be embedded in larger historical simulations. Related subfields are behavioral economics and human behavioral ecology.

- Data mining, web mining, predictive analytics
- Social media, web analytics, social networks
- Automated translation, natural language processing, Turing test
- Crowd computing has been applied to history, and offers another tool for historical verification and validation.

== Sectoral databases ==
In every sector of human activity, there are extensive databases for transportation data, urban development, health statistics, education data, social data, economic data—along with many projections. See Category:economic databases, Category:statistical data sets, Category:social statistics data, Category:social statistics and Category:statistics.

Some examples of database activity include Asian Development Bank statistics, World Bank data, and the International Monetary Fund data.

Time series analysis and econometrics are well established fields for the analysis of trends and forecasting; but, survey data and microdatasets can also be used in forecasts and simulations.

== Global, country, and sectoral models in international development ==
The United Nations and other organizations routinely project the population of individual countries and regions of the world decades into the future. These demographic models are used by other organizations for projecting demand for services in all sectors of each economy.

- International Monetary Fund - Finance, Government Accounts
- Organisation for Economic Co-operation and Development
- World Health Organization - Health
- Food and Agriculture Organization - Food and Agriculture
- International Labour Organization - Labour
- World Trade Organization - Trade
- World Bank - extensive modeling and data activities,

Each country often has their corresponding modeling groups for each of these major sectors. These can be grouped in separate articles according to sector. Groups include government departments, international aid agencies, as well as nonprofit and non-governmental organizations.

A broad class of models used for economic and social modeling of countries and sectors are the Computable general equilibrium (CGE) model - also called applied general equilibrium models. In the context of time based simulations and policy analysis, see dynamic stochastic general equilibrium models.

== Linked economic, social, and climate models ==
Partly because of the controversy over global climate change, there is an extensive network of global climate models, and related social and economic models. These seek to estimate, not only the change in climate and its physical effects, but also the impact on human society and the natural environment. See global economic models, social model, microsimulation, climate model, global climate models, and general circulation model.

The relationship between the environment and society is examined through environmental social science. human ecology, political ecology, and ecology, in general, can be areas where computer and mathematical modeling over time can be relevant to historical simulation.

== Historical simulations ==
Web-based historical simulations, simulations of history, interactive historical simulations, are increasingly popular for entertainment and educational purposes. The field is expanding rapidly and no central index seems to be available. Another example is

Several computer games allow players to interact with the game to model societies over time. The Civilization (series) is one example. Others include Age of Empires, Rise of Nations, Spore, Colonization, Alpha Centauri, Call to Power, and CivCity: Rome. A longer list of games in historical context, which might include degrees of simulation, are found at Category:Video games with historical settings.

Military simulation is a well-developed field and increasingly accessible on the internet.

== Simulating society ==
Computer models for simulating society fall under artificial society, social simulation, computational sociology, computational social science, and mathematical sociology. There is an interdisciplinary Journal of Artificial Societies and Social Simulation for computer simulation of social processes. The European Social Simulation Association promotes social simulation research in Europe; it is the publisher of JASSS. There is a corresponding Computational Social Science Society of the Americas., and a Pan-Asian Association for Agent-based Approach in Social Systems Sciences. PAAA lists some related Japanese associations.

The SimSoc (Simulated Society tool) is in its fifth edition.

== Cities ==
There has been extensive research in urban planning, environmental planning and related fields: regional planning, land-use planning, transportation planning, urban studies, and regional science. Journals for these fields are listed at List of planning journals.

SimCity is a game for simulations of artificial cities. It has spawned a range of "sim" games. The planning groups try to simulate changes in real cities. The game groups allow experiments with artificial cities. And the two are merging in such efforts as Vizicities

== Industry ==
The profiling of industries is well developed, and most industries make forecasts and plans. See industrial history, history of steel, history of mining, history of construction, history of the petroleum industry, and many other histories of specific industries. See cyclical industrial dynamics for modeling of industries in the sense of "historical dynamics of industries". Some related terms are industrial planning, history of industry, industrial evolution, technology change, and technology forecasting. An example of "history friendly" industrial models. from the journal, Industrial and Corporate Change.

Economy-wide models must take into account the interactions between industry and the rest of the economy. See Input–output model, economic planning, and social accounting matrix for some relevant techniques.

== Futures ==
Many of the techniques from futures studies are applicable to historical dynamics. Whether projecting forward from a point in the past to the present for validation studies, or projecting backwards from the present into the past - many of the techniques are useful. Likewise, simulations of the past, or alternative pasts, provide a groundwork of techniques for futures studies.

== Bibliography ==
- Turchin, Peter (2003). Historical Dynamics: Why States Rise and Fall. Princeton University Press. ISBN 9780691116693.
- Welfens, Paul J.J.; Knipping, Franz; Chirathivat, Suthiphand, eds. (November 17, 2005). Integration in Asia and Europe: Historical Dynamics, Political Issues, and Economic Perspectives. Springer. ISBN 9780387554037.
- Peter Turchin; Leonid Grinin; Andrey Korotayev; et al., eds. (January 1, 2006). History & Mathematics: Historical Dynamics and Development of Complex Societies. Editorial URSS. ISBN 9785484010028.
- History & Mathematics: Historical Dynamics and Development of Complex Societies, Russian intro, English language

== See also ==
- Cliodynamics
