= Social organism =

Model of social interactions

Social organism is a sociological concept, or model, wherein a society or social structure is regarded as a "living organism". Individuals interacting through the various entities comprising a society, such as law, family, crime, etc., are considered as they interact with other entities of the society to meet its needs. Every entity of a society, or social organism, has a function in helping maintain the organism's stability and cohesiveness.

== History ==
The model, or concept, of society-as-organism is traced by Walter M. Simon from Plato ('the organic theory of society'), and by George R. MacLay from Aristotle (384–322 BCE) through 19th-century and later thinkers, including the French philosopher and founder of sociology, Auguste Comte, the Scottish essayist, historian and philosopher Thomas Carlyle, the English philosopher and polymath Herbert Spencer, and the French sociologist Émile Durkheim.

According to Durkheim, the more specialized the function of an organism or society, the greater its development, and vice versa. The three core activities of a society are culture, politics, and economics. Societal health depends on the harmonious interworking of these three activities.

This concept was further developed beginning in 1904, over the next two decades, by the Austrian philosopher and social reformer Rudolf Steiner in his lectures, essays, and books on the Threefold Social Order. The "health" of a social organism can be thought of as a function of the interaction of culture, politics and rights, and economics, which in theory can be studied, modeled, and analyzed.

During his work on social order, Steiner developed his "Fundamental Social Law" of economic systems: "Most of all,... our times are suffering from the lack of any basic social understanding of how work can be incorporated into the social organism correctly, so that everything we do is truly performed for the sake of our fellow human beings. We can acquire this understanding only by learning to really insert our 'I' into the human community. New social forms will not be provided by nature but can emerge only from the human 'I' through real, person-to-person understanding—that is, when the needs of others become a matter of direct experience for us."

David Sloan Wilson, in his 2002 book, Darwin's Cathedral, applies his multilevel selection theory to social groups and proposes to think of society as an organism. Human groups thus function as single units rather than mere collections of individuals. He claims that organisms "survive and reproduce in their environments" and that "human groups in general, and religious groups in particular, qualify as organismic in this sense".

== See also ==
- Body politic
- Cognitive model § Mother-fetus cognitive model
- Global brain
- Historic recurrence
- Noosphere
- The Organic Theory of Societies
- Social physics
- Superorganism

== Bibliography ==
- George R. MacLay, The Social Organism: A Short History of the Idea that a Human Society May Be Regarded as a Gigantic Living Creature, North River Press, 1990, ISBN 978-0-88427-078-2.
- Henry Rawie, The Social Organism and its Natural Laws, Williams & Wilkins Co., 1990, ASIN B000879AT2.
- Rudolf Steiner, The Renewal of the Social Organism, Steiner Books, 1985, ISBN 978-0-88010-125-7.
- Oliver Luckett, Michel J Casey, The Social Organism: A Radical Understanding of Social Media to Transform Your Business and Life, Hachette Books, 2016, ISBN 978-0-31635-952-8.
