= Historical simulation =

Historical simulation may refer to:

- Historical simulation (finance), time series analysis
- Historical dynamics, realistic computer simulations of history
- Living history, historical re-creations, acting out history

== See also ==
- Simulation (disambiguation)
