= Deulofeu =

Deulofeu is a Catalan surname meaning "God-made-him", given in the past to people without known parents. Notable people with the surname include:

- Gerard Deulofeu (born 1994), Spanish footballer
- Alexandre Deulofeu (1903–1978), Spanish politician and historian
