= Francesc Pujols =

Spanish writer and philosopher

Francesc Pujols i Morgades (1882 in Barcelona – 1962 in Martorell) was a Catalan writer and philosopher.

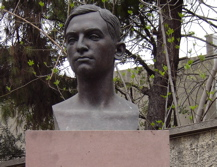
Francesc Pujols

== Biography ==
Pujols began to write poetry during his studies in secondary school, influenced by the work of Jacint Verdaguer and Joan Maragall. He took part in the literary competition Jocs Florals of Barcelona in 1902, and won the Natural Flower with the poem “Idil·li”.

In 1904 he published El llibre que conté les poesies de Francesc Pujols, with a prologue by Maragall, who saw in Pujols a representative of the “living word”.

In that same year, he gave his first lecture at the Ateneu Barcelonès on the subject of the painter Marian Pidelaserra, and thus began his career as an art critic which he continued later in the book Recull de crítica artística (1921). He made a name for himself as one of the first defenders of the then controversial architect Antoni Gaudí, to whom he dedicated his book La visió artística i religiosa d’en Gaudí (1927), translated into French by the painter Salvador Dalí and published in Lausanne in 1969.

In 1906, under the pen name of Augusto de Altozanos, he published his only novel, El Nuevo Pascual o la Prostitución, a humorous work written in Spanish directly translated from Catalan. He moved to Madrid, where he went more deeply into his painting and philosophical studies and met the politician Francesc Cambó. In 1908, back in Barcelona, he frequented the group of the Ateneu Barcelonès, of which he became the secretary in 1924, when Pompeu Fabra was the president. He took part in the foundation of the group Les Arts i els Artistes and the weekly Papitu, which he later edited. On the theatre side, he published El llibre de Job (1922), written in Pitarresque verse, and the tragedy Medeia (1923).

In 1918, Francesc Pujols published the work Concepte General de la Ciència Catalana, in which he established the existence of a Catalan philosophical tendency, started by Ramon Llull and continued by Raymond of Sabunde (Ramon Sibiuda); this work contains his famous prophecy according to which the Catalans are exceptional beings because they are children of the land of truth such that the day will come when Catalans, for the sole fact of being so, will go around the world and we will have everything paid for ("Arribarà un dia que els catalans, pel sol fet de ser catalans, anirem pel món i ho tindrem tot pagat"). He wrote other philosophical works in successive years, such as L’evolució i els principis immutables (1921) or Hiparxiologi o Ritual de la Religió Catalana (1937).

Francesc Pujols builds a philosophical system first called Sumpèctica or Science of the Concrete, later Hiparxiologia or Science of the Existence, and finally Pantologia or Science of the Whole. In year 1931, the writer Josep Pla dedicated a book to his thought entitled El sistema de Francesc Pujols. Manual d’Hiparxiologia.

In 1926, Pujols published in two volumes Història de l’hegemonia catalana en la política espanyola. Settled in Martorell, he wrote several works of a political nature such as La solució Cambó (1931) or El problema peninsular (1935).

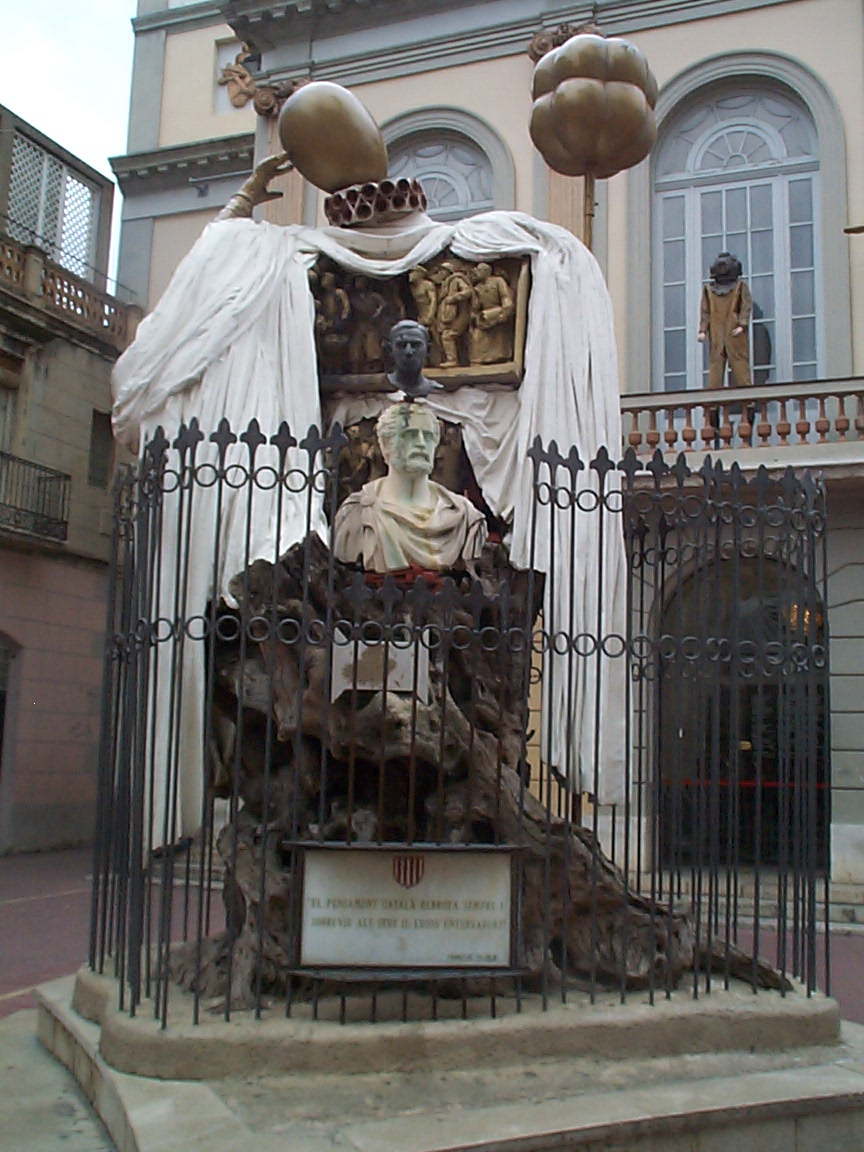
Monument to Francesc Pujols, Teatre-Museu Dalí, Figueres, Spain

At the end of the Spanish Civil War he went into exile in Prada de Conflent under the hospitality of Pablo Casals (1939), and moved later to the Résidence des Intellectuels Catalans in Montpellier, where he met the writer and scientist Alexandre Deulofeu, and discoursed before young intellectuals such as the critic art Alexandre Cirici Pellicer, the politician Heribert Barrera and Salvador Dalí. Dalí was especially enthralled with Pujols' philosophy: in 1960, he executed an oil painting titled Hyparxiological Sky, and in 1974 published a book, Pujols per Dalí, dedicated to his many conversations with Pujols. Finally, Dalí erected a monument to Francesc Pujols outside the entrance to the Dalí Theatre and Museum in Figueres, Catalonia.

Pujols returned to Catalonia in 1942, and spent a month in prison Model in Barcelona. From 1949 and until his death, he wrote in publications such as Destino.
