= Journal of Experimental Child Psychology =

- Discipline: Experimental psychology, child psychology
- Language: English
- Edited by: David F. Bjorklund

Publication details
- History: 1964–present
- Publisher: Elsevier
- Frequency: Monthly
- Impact factor: 2.424 (2017)

Standard abbreviations
- ISO 4: J. Exp. Child Psychol.

Indexing
- CODEN: JECPAE
- ISSN: 0022-0965 (print); 1096-0457 (web)
- OCLC no.: 01431145

Links
- Journal homepage; Online access

The Journal of Experimental Child Psychology is a monthly peer-reviewed academic journal covering experimental child psychology. It was established in 1964 and is published by Elsevier (formerly Academic Press). The editor-in-chief is David F. Bjorklund (Florida Atlantic University). According to the Journal Citation Reports, the journal has a 2017 impact factor of 2.424.
