= Unni Wikan =

Norwegian anthropologist

- Born: 18 November 1944; Ibestad, Troms, Norway
- Spouse: Fredrik Barth

Unni Wikan (born 18 November 1944) is professor of social anthropology at the University of Oslo, Norway. She has served as visiting professor at the University of Chicago (2011); Harvard University (1999–2000); Goethe University, Frankfurt (2000); London School of Economics (1997); and École des Hautes Études en Sciences Sociales, Paris (1996). She has also been a visiting scholar at Harvard University (1995); guest lecturer at Harvard (1987); guest lecturer at Ben-Gurion University of the Negev, Israel (1983); and visiting assistant professor at Johns Hopkins University (1977).

== Career and controversy ==
Wikan has worked as a consultant to UNICEF and the World Food Programme in Bhutan from 1989 to 1994, the Norwegian Agency for Development Cooperation in Palestinian areas in 1999, and United Nations Development Program in Yemen (2004).

For almost ten years, Wikan has campaigned to change Norwegian policies towards immigrants, arguing that generous welfare and a policy of multicultural tolerance are creating a culture of welfare dependence, and destroying self-respect.

She has argued that far from being a racist, she has significant empathy for the lives of many of the Muslim men she has portrayed in her most recent books. In a well-known case in Norway (The Anooshe case), she argued that the state had not taken into account the social expectations of immigrant men, and this had led to rootless men whose social expectations were not met or even acknowledged, arguing that violence is a product of immigrant conditions when host country laws conflict with the "unwritten social rules" of immigrant societies.

Wikan has performed field work in a number of countries (Egypt, Oman, Yemen, Indonesia, Bhutan, Scandinavia) and her research has resulted in ten books being published. Her works have been translated into Japanese, Arabic, Kurdish, Portuguese, Swedish, Danish, German, and Italian.

Wikan was awarded the 2004 Fritt Ord Award "for her insightful, outspoken and challenging contribution to the debate on value conflicts in the multi-cultural society."

She is a member of the Norwegian Academy of Science and Letters.

== Writings ==
- Life Among the Poor in Cairo (Tavistock 1980) ISBN 978-0-422-76980-8
- Behind the Veil in Arabia: Women in Oman (Johns Hopkins University Press, 1982; paperback, Univ. of Chicago Press, 1991) ISBN 978-0-226-89683-0
- Managing Turbulent Hearts: A Balinese Formula for Living (University of Chicago Press, 1990) ISBN 978-0-226-89680-9
- Mot en ny norsk underklasse: Innvandrere, kultur og integrasjon (Gyldendal, 1995) ISBN 978-82-05-23509-0
- Tomorrow, God Willing: Self-Made Destinies in Cairo (University of Chicago Press, 1996) ISBN 978-0-226-89835-3
- Generous Betrayal: Politics of Culture in the New Europe (University of Chicago Press, 2002) ISBN 978-0-226-89685-4
- For ærens skyld - Fadime til ettertanke (Scandinavian University Press, 2003)
- Medmennesker: 35 år i Kairos bakgater (Pax, 2004) 9788253027388
- "Om ære." (Pax, 2008) ISBN 978-82-530-3096-8
- In Honor of Fadime: Murder and Shame (University of Chicago Press, 2008) ISBN 978-0-226-89686-1 Read an excerpt.
- "Resonance: Beyond the Words" (University of Chicago Press, forthcoming November 2012)

== Notes ==
Awards
Preceded by Berge Furre	Recipient of the Fritt Ord Award; 2004	Succeeded by Nina Witoszek
