= Cliodynamics (journal) =

- Discipline: Cultural studies, History, Mathematics - Applied
- Language: English
- Edited by: Jack Goldstone and Andrey Korotayev

Publication details
- History: 2010–present
- Publisher: eScholarship Publishing University of California (United States)
- Open access: Yes
- License: CC-BY 4.0

Standard abbreviations
- ISO 4: Cliodynamics

Indexing
- ISSN: 2373-7530

Links
- Journal homepage

Cliodynamics: The Journal of Quantitative History and Cultural Evolution is a peer-reviewed open access scholarly journal publishing original articles advancing the state of theoretical knowledge in the transdisciplinary area of cliodynamics, theoretical history, and cultural evolution. It is an initiative of The Institute for Research on World-Systems at the University of California, Riverside. Peter Turchin was its first editor-in-chief. The current editors-in-chief are Jack Goldstone and Andrey Korotayev.

== Abstracting and indexing ==
The journal is abstracted and indexed in:

- DOAJ
- Scopus
