= Siri Sverdrup Lunden =

Siri Sverdrup Lunden (23 March 1920, in Kongsberg, Norway – 24 August 2003, in Trondheim) was a Norwegian Professor of Slavic languages at the University of Oslo 1971–1987, married to Professor Terkel Nissen Rosenqvist.

== Biography ==
Sverdrup Lunden was the daughter of feminist and peace activist Mimi Sverdrup Lunden. She was raised in Oslo, and during World War II she was interested in the Soviet Union and the Russian language. She started on studies of Slavic languages after the war, and graduated at the University of Oslo in 1958 with a thesis on Peter the Great s pronunciation of Russian. In 1960, she teacher at the Institute for Slavic languages. She took PhD one in 1969 with the thesis «The Trondheim Russian-German MS Vocabulary: A Contribution to Seventeenth-Century Russian Lexicography», an examination of a Russian manuscript was found in Norway in 1927. In 1971 she was appointed professor of Slavic languages and the successor of Christian Schweigaard Stang. She retained this position until her retirement in 1987.

== Professional career ==
Sverdrup Lunden helped to modernize the study of Russian at the University of Oslo, who had previously been focused on historical linguistics. Her predecessor in the Chair, C.S. Stang, had been concerned with research on comparative Baltic and Slavic languages, while Sverdrup Lunden emphasized the modern Russian language. However, she was interested in the old Russian, and in 1987 she published a Norwegian translation of Slovo o polku Igoreve. She also published a book about russenorsk (Russian-Norwegian), and was president of the Norwegian-Bulgarian Association.

== Publications ==
- The Trondheim Russian-German MS vocabulary : a contribution to 17th-century Russian lexicography. Oslo: Universitetsforlaget, 1972.
- Russenorsk revisited. Oslo: Universitetet i Oslo, 1978.
