= Terkel Rosenqvist =

Norwegian chemist and metallurgist

Terkel Nissen Rosenqvist (2 October 1921 – 1 April 2011) was a Norwegian chemist and metallurgist.

== Biography ==
He was born in Aker. His parents were businessman Einar Rosenqvist (1892–1962) and Julia (Mulka) Marija Kos (1893–1939). His brother was Ivan Th. Rosenqvist. From 1945 to 1963 he was married to Tone Barth (January 25, 1924 – October 10, 1980), the sister of Professor of Social Anthropology Fredrik Barth (born 1928). He later married Siri Sverdrup Lunden (1920–2003).

He finished his secondary education in 1938 and graduated from the University of Oslo with the cand.real. degree in 1943. He was a research assistant at the university, and also worked as a chemist and metallurgist for Elektrokemisk and Christiania Spigerverk. He was appointed at the Norwegian Institute of Technology in 1945, before being an instructor from 1947 and assistant professor from 1950 at the University of Chicago. He was appointed as an acting docent at the Norwegian Institute of Technology in 1952, and after taking his dr.techn. degree in 1954 he was promoted to professor in 1955.

He was a member of the Royal Norwegian Society of Sciences and Letters, the Norwegian Academy of Technological Sciences, and the Norwegian Academy of Science and Letters. He was a visiting scholar at the Massachusetts Institute of Technology from 1959 to 1960, the University of Wisconsin in 1964 and the Middle East Technical University (for UNESCO) from 1966 to 1968. He has chaired regional branches of the Norwegian Chemical Society and the Riksmål Society. He resided in Trondheim until his death 1 April 2011.
