= La Revanche des berceaux =

Demographic phenomenon in Canada

La Revanche des berceaux (French for "the revenge of the cradles") is an expression referring to the high birth rate of French Canadians prior to the late 20th century. The phrase originated in Quebec before the First World War, according to John Robert Colombo's "Colombo's Canadian References." The expression suggests that, although English Canadians dominated Canada in the 19th century, the high birth rate of French Canadians would allow them to remain politically strong in Quebec and also to maintain their demographic weight within Canada - thus permitting resistance to cultural assimilation into English Canadian culture.

The "revenge" of the phrase references the Conquest of New France by the British in 1763. Under British rule, new immigrants to Canada came overwhelmingly from English-speaking regions, allowing English-speakers to eventually become the majority of the overall Canadian population. The implication of the phrase is that it would not be possible to discriminate against Francophones if their population remained proportionally large enough. With little Francophone immigration, the French-Canadian population could only maintain its share of the total if its birth rate exceeded that of Anglophones.

Since the Quiet Revolution of the 1960s, however, Quebec has experienced sub-replacement fertility, which has caused anxiety about the future of Quebec's culture and population.

== See also ==
- History of Quebec
- Timeline of Quebec history
- Demographic threat
- Youth bulge
- Multiculturalism
- Aging of Europe
