= Demographic threat =

Term used in political conversation or demography

The concept of demographic threat (or demographic bomb) is a term used in political conversation or demography to refer to population increases from within a minority ethnic or religious group in a given country that is perceived as threatening to the ethnic, racial or religious majority, stability of the country or to the identity of said countries in which it is present. The term is often used by the far-right as a racial dogwhistle.

== Examples in countries ==
=== Australia ===
In 1984, Geoffrey Blainey, an Australian historian and academic criticised a comment by a spokesman to Immigration Minister Stewart West of the Australian Labor Party that "the increasing Asianisation was inevitable".

Blainey responded, "I do not accept the view, widely held in the Federal Cabinet, that some kind of slow Asian takeover of Australia is inevitable. I do not believe that we are powerless. I do believe that we can with good will and good sense control our destiny.... As a people, we seem to move from extreme to extreme. In the past 30 years the government of Australia has moved from the extreme of wanting a white Australia to the extreme of saying that we will have an Asian Australia and that the quicker we move towards it the better".

In the 1996 Australian federal election, Pauline Hanson was elected to the Division of Oxley. In her controversial maiden speech to the Australian House of Representatives, she expressed her belief that Australia "was in danger of being swamped by Asians". Hanson went on to form the One Nation Party, which initially won nearly one quarter of the vote in Queensland state elections before it entering a period of decline because of internal disputes. The name "One Nation" was meant to signify national unity in contrast to what Hanson claimed as an increasing division in Australian society caused by government policies favouring migrants (multiculturalism) and indigenous Australians.

=== Bahrain ===
Thousands of Bahraini Shia Muslims protested in March 2011 against the Bahraini government's naturalisation policy of granting citizenship to Sunni Muslims from other countries serving in the military of Bahrain.

=== Bhutan ===
Bhutan has a long-standing concern with the demographic threat posed by the immigration of ethnically distinct Nepali immigrants.

=== Canada ===
During the 19th and 20th centuries (until the 1960s), the French-speaking Catholic minority of Canada managed to maintain its share of the population due to a high birth rate, dubbed the "revenge of the cradle."

=== Estonia ===
In Estonia, one of the causes of the Singing Revolution was the concern over the demographic threat to the national identity posed by the influx of individuals from foreign ethnic groups to work on such large Soviet development projects as phosphate mining.

=== India ===
Many Hindu Indians see Muslims as a "demographic threat" because of their large population growth due to high fertility rates and because of the high rate of illegal immigration from Bangladesh.

=== Israel ===
In the 1950s, Shoham Melamad found that the high fertility rate of Arabs was viewed as a demographic threat to the Jewish nation. Rabbi Menachem Mendel Schneerson, however, stated that Arabs in Israel should be treated equally to any other Israeli citizens and be allowed to have children just like any other citizen. A 1967 Maariv editorial penned by Shmuel Schnitzer, a prominent journalist, suggested that Jews should be encouraged to have large families, while Palestinians in the West Bank, Gaza Strip and in Israel should be encouraged to adopt birth control measures. Schnitzer also advocated for the adoption of an open policy encouraging Arabs to emigrate from Israel.

In 2003, Benjamin Netanyahu opined that if the percentage of Arab citizens of Israel rises above its current level of about 20 percent, Israel would not be able to retain a Jewish demographic majority, the basis of Israel's self-definition as a "Jewish democratic state". Netanyahu's comments were criticized as racist by Arab Knesset members and the Association for Civil Rights in Israel. In May 2009, Michael Oren wrote an article in Commentary in which he discussed the "Arab Demographic Threat" as one of "Seven Existential Threats" facing Israel. In 2005, Shimon Peres told US officials that Israel had "lost" land in the Negev "to the Bedouin" and would need to take steps to "relieve" the "demographic threat". In 2010, Netanyahu warned in a government meeting that a Negev "without a Jewish majority" would pose "a palpable threat". In February 2014, then Israeli finance minister Yair Lapid said failure to establish a Palestinian state would leave Israel facing a demographic threat that could undermine its Jewish and democratic nature.

=== Malaysia ===
The Malaysian government has been accused of masterminding Project IC to alter the demographic pattern of the East Malaysian state of Sabah.

=== New Zealand ===
Fears of changing demographics caused by high immigration from the Asia-Pacific region and birth rates of the native Māori people, particularly among older Pākehā (European-descended New Zealanders), have found their way into parliamentary politics.

Extremist groups in New Zealand, such as Action Zealandia, have been blacklisted by social media networks for inciting fears about "demographic replacement" at the "expense of the European community". The 2019 Christchurch mosque shootings also drew closer attention to such groups forming links with like-minded ethno-nationalists overseas, in a ‘networked white rage’.

=== Northern Ireland ===
In Northern Ireland, Protestants are more likely to favour continued political union with the United Kingdom, (Irish Unionism) and Catholics are more likely to favour political union with the Republic of Ireland (Irish Republicanism or Irish Nationalism). When Ireland was partitioned in the 1920s and Northern Ireland came into existence, Protestants were roughly 60% of the population, but as a result of higher fertility rates among Catholics, their share of the population has dropped to less than 50% in the 2011 census, while Catholics numbered only slightly fewer than Protestants. There is debate over whether and to what extent the trend will continue and its possible impact on the political situation. Northern Ireland elected its first nationalist First Minister in 2024 after Sinn Féin placed first in the 2022 Northern Ireland Assembly election and a two year period of negotiations to form a new power sharing government was overcome. However, in practice the offices of First Minister and Deputy First Minister are nigh-identical in powers and public profile and all important legislation requires cross-community support, making it impossible for either community to simply overrule the other. A continuing trend in Northern Irish politics since the 1998 Good Friday Agreement is that the share of members of the Northern Ireland Assembly who identify as "other" (i.e. neither Unionist nor Nationalist) tends to rise with every new election. Whether this is related to increasing irreligion among the population or other factors is unclear.

=== Russia ===
Russia fears the "demographic threat" posed by the potential for "large-scale Chinese immigration" to its thinly populated far east. Illegal immigration of Chinese nationals is a special concern. Parts of the Russian Far East like Outer Manchuria were claimed and/or administered by Qing China prior to Unequal Treaties like the 1858 Treaty of Aigun or the 1860 Convention of Peking that ceded these lands to Russia, giving the issue an aspect of Chinese irredentism that is however currently not openly discussed among China's ruling elite as a good relationship with Russia is seen as geostrategically advantageous. There were also fears of a Muslim-majority Russia eventually coming into fruition (for instance, by Paul A. Goble), though such fears have also been criticized as being unrealistic, irrational, and/or unfounded.

=== Sweden ===
Sweden's main statistics bureau, Statistics Sweden (SCB), does not keep any detailed record of ethnicity, but about 20% of Sweden's population is of foreign background. Some immigrants in Sweden feel that they experience "betweenship" that arises when others ascribe them an identity that they do not hold.

The growing numbers of immigrants has coincided with the rise of and anti-immigration political party, the Sweden Democrats, which believe in a demographic threat, especially by the rise of Islam in Sweden. Since the 1990s, polls show that people in Sweden have gradually become more positive to asylum-seekers.

=== United States ===
Some in the United States have expressed concern about the "demographic threat" posed by migrants from Latin America, particularly Mexico, and their descendants. In a similar vein, in 2000, Peter Brimelow of the immigration restrictionist website VDARE set forth a conspiracy theory that the Democratic Party, with the illogically imagined support of the Republican Party, is importing a new, less white, electorate that is more favorable to the former.

== See also ==
- Demographic trap
- Fifth column
- Great Replacement
- Majority-minority
- Natalism
- Political demography
- Replacement migration
- Revenge of the cradle
- White demographic decline

== Bibliography ==
- Masalha, Nur (2000). Imperial Israel And The Palestinians: The Politics of Expansion. Pluto Press. ISBN 0-7453-1615-8
- Shenhav, Yehouda (2006). The Arab Jews: A Postcolonial Reading of Nationalism, Religion, and Ethnicity. Stanford University Press. ISBN 0-8047-5296-6
- Pat Buchanan, The Death of the West (2001)
