= Modes of religiosity =

The theory of divergent modes of religiosity (DMR) is intended to explain how religions are created, transmitted, and changed. DMR theory was first developed by anthropologist Harvey Whitehouse following his ethnographic fieldwork in Papua New Guinea. The theory proposes that religions tend to coalesce around two divergent modes, termed imagistic and doctrinal, which are distinguished primarily by their ritual practices. The imagistic mode is characterized by infrequently performed, high arousal rituals (e.g. initiation rites) and is associated with small scale, exclusive religious groups. In contrast the doctrinal mode is characterized by frequently performed, low arousal rituals (e.g. daily recitations of sacred texts) and is associated with larger inclusive communities, as found in the major world religions.

The theory posits that these differing ritual patterns promote the transmission of religious traditions by exploiting core memory processes. Imagistic rituals arouse strong emotion and generate vivid, flashbulb like, episodic memories, while doctrinal rituals repetitive nature means that rather than individual events the experiences over time are stored in procedural and semantic memories. Later formulations of the theory also emphasised the different forms of group cohesion that are generated by the two modes, with imagistic rituals promoting intense, relational bonds with the other ritual participants and doctrinal rituals promoting more diffuse, categorical bonds with larger communities who share the same identity markers.

DMR theory was tested empirically against data on 645 rituals from the HRAF global ethnographic database and the anticipated clustering of rituals around imagistic and doctrinal modes was confirmed. Ethnographic and historical examinations of the theory have been broadly positive and archaeologists have drawn upon DMR to explain the transition from small-scale societies to larger, more complex civilizations. Similarly, historians and biologists have utilized DMR theory to help explain why some religions separate into sects and how reformations may occur. However, the theory has been challenged by some scholars on theoretical grounds and faced criticisms from some ethnographers and historians for suggesting too strong of a division between imagistic and doctrinal modes.

Although the DMR theory developed out of research on religious groups, more recent research has found evidence that the ritual dynamics described apply outside of the religious domain, including amongst football fans and armed militias, and that it may therefore serve as a more general theory of ritual and social cohesion.

== Imagistic mode ==
The imagistic mode of religiosity involves collective rituals that are infrequent and highly emotional. Examples of these types of rituals include various initiation rites and rites of passage. The often dysphoric and highly emotional nature of these types of rituals activate the episodic memory system, resulting in detailed autobiographical memories. These dysphoric rituals can produce an extreme form of cohesion with the group, known as identity fusion. DMR posits that fusion with other group members will also motivate the individual to act out extreme forms of altruism, especially when the group is threatened. Therefore, the imagistic mode of religiosity prevails when a group's survival depends on extremely high levels of cohesion.

== Doctrinal mode ==
The doctrinal mode of religiosity refers to collective rituals that are frequent, usually routinized, and generate relatively little affect. Examples of this type of collective ritual would include Holy Communion and call to prayer. Due to the repetitive nature of these types of rituals, semantic memory systems are thought to be activated and function similarly to organizing other general schemas and scripts of general knowledge. In contrast to the imagistic mode, these routinized rituals tend to produce less intense group identification, which serves to promote trust and cooperation but not extreme self-sacrifice. DMR posits that the historical transition from small-scale societies to the invention of agriculture brought about the need for large-scale cooperation and collective identity.
