= Jack Goldstone =

American historian

- Born: Jack A. Goldstone; September 30, 1953 (age 73)
- Education: Harvard University
- Occupations: Sociologist, political scientist, historian

Jack A. Goldstone (born September 30, 1953) is an American sociologist, political scientist, and historian, specializing in studies of social movements, revolutions, political demography, and the 'Rise of the West' in world history. He is an author or editor of 13 books and over 150 research articles. He is recognized as one of the leading authorities on revolutions and long-term social change.

== Career ==
His work has made foundational contributions to the fields of cliodynamics, economic history, and political demography. He was the first scholar to describe in detail and document the long-term cyclical relationship between global population and of political rebellion and revolution.

He is a core member of the "California school" in world history, which replaced the standard view of a dynamic West and stagnant East with a 'late divergence' model in which Eastern and Western civilizations underwent similar political and economic cycles until the 18th century, when Europe achieved the technical breakthroughs of industrialization. He is one of the founders of the field of political demography, studying the impact of local, regional, and global population trends on international security and national politics.

=== Appointments ===
Goldstone is the Virginia E. and John T. Hazel Jr. Professor of Public Policy and Eminent Scholar in the Schar School of Policy and Government at George Mason University in Arlington, Virginia. In 2016 he was the Elman Family Professor of Public Policy at Hong Kong University of Science and Technology and Director of the HKUST Institute for Public Policy.

In 2013–2015, he was the founding director of the Research Laboratory in Political Demography and Macrosocial Dynamics at the Russian Presidential Academy of National Economy and Public Administration in Moscow. He has also worked as a consultant of the US government, for example, serving as chair of the National Research Council's evaluation of USAID Democracy Assistance Programs. He has been a non-resident Senior Fellow at the Brookings Institution and was a Global Fellow of the Wilson Center. Since 2024 he (together with Andrey Korotayev) is the co-editor of Cliodynamics:The Journal of Quantitative History and Cultural Evolution .

== Awards ==
His academic awards include the American Sociological Association Distinguished Scholarly Publication Award for 'Revolution and Rebellion in the Early Modern World' and the Myron Weiner Award for lifetime scholarly achievement from the International Studies Association. He has won the Arnaldo Momigliano Award of the Historical Society, and seven awards for 'best article' in the fields of Comparative/Historical Sociology, Political Sociology, Social Theory, and Collective Behavior and Social Movements.

He has won fellowships from the Council of Learned Societies, the U.S. Institute of Peace, the MacArthur Foundation, The John Simon Guggenheim Foundation, the Andrew Carnegie Foundation, the Australian Research School of Social Sciences, the Canadian Institute for Advanced Research, the Center for Advanced Study in the Behavioral Sciences, and is an elected member of the Council on Foreign Affairs and the Sociological Research Association. He has been the Richard Holbrooke Visiting Lecturer at the American Academy in Berlin, the Crayborough Lecturer at Leiden University, and a Phi Beta Kappa National Visiting Scholar.

== Works ==
- Handbook of Revolutions in the 21st Century. The New Waves of Revolutions, and the Causes and Effects of Disruptive Political Change (Springer, 2022).
- International Handbook of Population Policies (Springer, 2022).
- Phases of global demographic transition correlate with phases of the Great Divergence and Great Convergence, Technological Forecasting and Social Change (2015)
- Revolutions: A Very Short Introduction (2014)
- Political Demography: How Population Changes are Reshaping International Security and National Politics co-edited with Eric P. Kaufmann and Monica Duffy Toft (2012)
- Understanding the Revolutions of 2011: Weakness and Resilience in Middle Eastern Autocracies Foreign Affairs (2011)
- "The New Population Bomb", Foreign Affairs (2010)
- Why Europe? The Rise of the West in World History 1500–1850 (2008)
- States, Parties, and Social Movements (2003)
- Revolutions: Theoretical, Compararative, and Historical Studies (2003) ISBN 9780155066793
- Goldstone, Jack A. (2016) [1991]. Revolution and Rebellion in the Early Modern World: Population Change and State Breakdown in England, France, Turkey, and China,1600–1850 (25th Anniversary ed.). Routledge. ISBN 9781315408606.
- Revolutions of the Late Twentieth Century (1991)

== See also ==
- Cliodynamics
- Structural-demographic theory
- Elite overproduction
