= Seshat (project) =

International scientific research project

Seshat: Global History Databank

The Seshat: Global History Databank (named after Seshat, the ancient Egyptian goddess of wisdom, knowledge, and writing) is an international scientific research project of the nonprofit Evolution Institute. Founded in 2011, the Seshat: Global History Databank gathers data into a single, large database that can be used to test scientific hypotheses. The Databank consults directly with expert scholars to code what historical societies and their environments were like in the form of accessible datapoints and thus forms a digital storehouse for data on the political and social organization of all human groups from the early modern back to the ancient and neolithic periods. The organizers of this research project contend that the mass of data then can be used to test a variety of competing hypotheses about the rise and fall of large-scale societies around the globe which may help science provide answers to global problems.

The Seshat: Global History Databank claims to be a scientific approach to historical research, and its large dataset, though compiled with the intention of being theory-neutral, is frequently of interest to researchers of cliodynamics. The main goal of cliodynamics researchers is to use the scientific method to produce the data necessary to empirically test competing theories. A large interdisciplinary and international team of experts helps the Seshat project to produce a database that is historically rigorous enough to study the past using well-established scientific techniques. Seshat data may be used with sociocultural evolutionary theory or cultural evolutionary theory to identify long-term dynamics that may have had significant effects on the course of human history.

== Project ==
The Seshat: Global History Databank is an umbrella organization for several research projects that examine different themes or facets of human life. Each project is led by members of the Seshat Team in collaboration with a group of consultants and contributing experts. Themes include: the evolution of social complexity in early civilizations, the creation of prosociality (i.e., how and why large groups of unrelated individuals come together and cooperate for a common goal), the role of ritual and religion in social cohesion, the causes of economic growth and its consequences on individual's well-being, and many others. The Seshat team is also heavily engaged in improving the way that cutting-edge digital technologies can aid in research, with projects devoted to developing cutting-edge systems for collecting, analyzing, and distributing information with computer assistance.

Several key research questions drive these research projects. These include the following: What mechanisms transform economic growth into improvements in quality of life for regular people? What roles do ritual activities and religion play in cultural development and group cohesion? How and under what conditions does prosocial behavior evolve in large societies? What is the impact of environmental and climatic factors in societal advance?

To maximise their time and resources, the Seshat project has begun data collection with a representative sample of polities from around the globe and throughout human history, ranging from the late Neolithic (roughly 4,000 BCE) to the early modern period (roughly 1,900 CE). This is the World Sample 30. The World Sample-30 provides the Seshat project with an initial sample of societies that vary along the dimension of social complexity from ten major regions around the globe. Three natural geographic areas (NGAs) were selected within each region––one NGA was selected in each world region that developed complex state-level societies comparatively early; a second NGA was selected that selected complex societies comparatively late, ideally one free of centralized polities (chiefdoms and states) until the colonial period; a third NGA was selected that was intermediate to these two extremes in terms of social complexity.

=== Praise ===
In 2016, Ian Morris praised two key aspects of the Seshat project: (1) it emphasizes the collection of data related to shifts in cultural systems (e.g., changes in religious morality or agricultural techniques) in addition to material elements (e.g., metallurgy technologies) and (2) it better situates seemingly extraordinary individuals in their geographic and historical context.

Gary Feinman also praised the Seshat Project for helping to demolish the academic knowledge silos that have emerged with increases in specialisation over the last several decades.

=== Criticism ===
Critics of the Seshat project have noted that the coding of historical data is not a wholly objective enterprise and that concrete and transparent steps should be taken to minimize subjectivity in the coding process. The Seshat project uses multiple coders and experts and other techniques for ensuring data quality, but some have recently suggested that machine coding techniques hold great promise for further reducing biases and increasing the reliability of the data produced.

=== Funding ===
Funding for the Seshat: Global History Databank comes from the John Templeton Foundation, the Economic and Social Research Council, Horizon 2020, the Tricoastal Foundation, and the Evolution Institute.

=== Administration ===
The Seshat: Global History Databank is governed by an editorial board, which includes Peter Turchin, Harvey Whitehouse, Pieter François, Thomas E. Currie, and Kevin C. Feeney.

== See also ==
- Big History
- Cliodynamics
- Cliometrics
- Digital history
- Longue durée
- Psychohistory
