= Evolution Institute =

US non-profit organization

Evolution Institute, Inc.
- Founded: August 31, 2010
- Type: 501(c)(3)
- Tax ID no.: EIN 273353656
- Registration no.: N10000008209
- Location: Tampa, Florida
- Website: evolution-institute.org

The Evolution Institute (EI) is a non-profit organization whose mission is to apply science-based solutions and use evidence-based best practices to solve today’s most pressing social issues to improve quality of life.

It was founded by David Sloan Wilson and Jerry Lieberman in 2008 and is based near Tampa, Florida.

== History ==
In 2007, Jerry Lieberman, political scientist and then president of the Humanists of Florida Association, reached out to David Sloan Wilson, evolutionary biologist and author of Evolution for Everyone. Together they agreed to start an applied science-based organization informed by evolutionary principles. At the time, David had just started a community-based research project in Binghamton, NY that aligned with this objective.

One of the first topics of interest for EI was early childhood education, as well as economics and the nature of work in the context of the great recession of 2008. This developed into a focus on quality of life, with Norway as a case study of cultural evolution.

In 2010, cliodynamics scientist Peter Turchin joined EI as Vice-President and founding member of the Board of Directors. Turchin founded the Seshat: Global History Databank in 2011, a project that is currently part of the Evolution Institute.

The online magazine This View of Life was founded in 2014 by EI associate Robert Kadar and David Sloan Wilson. In 2015, Evonomics: The Next Evolution of Economics was launched by founding editor Robert Kadar with support from the Evolution Institute. In addition, the EI held a workshop in 2015, “Advancing the Study of Cultural Evolution: Academic Integration and Policy Applications,” that led to the formation of the Cultural Evolution Society, a professional scientific society which aims to advance the theory and practice of cultural evolutionary studies.

In 2017, Evolution Institute opened a public charter school in an underserved community of East Tampa, FL as part of their education initiative to improve learning outcomes using science informed solutions and practices.

== Work ==
=== Workshops ===
Evolution Institute has organized conferences and workshops with groups such as University of Miami, University of Oslo, UnitedWay Suncoast, and Mondragon Corporation.

The workshop with UnitedWay Suncoast involved national leaders on child development, early childhood care, and education policy, as well as researchers who advise the White House. Educators were presented with key findings from current research around language and learning, stages of development, and state policies conducive to early learning. Speakers included David F. Bjorklund, Michelle Shimberg, Steve Barnett, Representative Laura Hall, Dave Dickinson, and Roberta Golinkoff.

The Evolution Institute has held several workshops to understand Norway’s continuously high quality of life from an evolutionary perspective, including one in 2015 organized in Oslo with Norwegian think tank Agenda. The EI President at the time, David Sloan Wilson, was offered the Arne Naess Chair in Global Justice and the Environment at the University of Oslo and helped organize an advanced PhD course, ‘The Cultural Welfare of Nations.’ There have been ongoing collaborations with Norwegian scholars such as Nina Witoszek and Dag Hessen.

In 2019 Evolution Institute jointly organized a summit with Mondragon Corporation at their headquarters in Spain. As a result, LKS, the management consultancy division of Mondragon, conducted an in-depth assessment of East Pasco, Florida’s potential to develop cooperative enterprises in which economic sectors and activities were identified based on growth potential and contribution to equitable economic systems. A follow-up online workshop was held in 2020.

=== Projects and Publications ===
Over the years EI has produced an array of publications with themes including evolutionary principles, childhood development, the Nordic model, cooperation, and community building. Sustainable Modernity:The Nordic Model and Beyond (2018) was edited by EI board member Nina Witoszek and features contributions from co-founders Jerry Lieberman and David Sloan Wilson.

EI currently hosts the Seshat: Global History Databank, an international research project that brings together a comprehensive body of knowledge about human history to “rigorously test different hypotheses about the rise and fall of large-scale societies across the globe and human history.” Themes have included the evolution of social complexity in early civilizations, the role of ritual and religion in social cohesion, and economic and demographic trends for political upheaval.

In addition to the public charter school East Tampa Academy, in 2020 an early learning center was opened in Tommytown, Florida as part of EI’s East Pasco Initiative. This was in partnership with community-based organizations Farmworkers Self-Help and Resurrection House Mission, with a focus on making the proven benefits of early learning accessible to immigrant families.

According to EI website their core list of projects and areas of focus include:

- East Tampa Academy
- East Pasco Initiative
- Norway Quality of Life
- Seshat Historical Databank

== Endorsements ==
The Evolution Institute has received endorsements from figures such as Jonathan Haidt, Jared Diamond, E.O. Wilson, George Rabb, and Bernard Winograd.

== Board of directors ==
EI is governed by a Board of Directors that includes:

- Michelle Shimberg
- David F. Bjorklund
- Jerome Lieberman
- David Sloan Wilson
- Peter Turchin
- Julie Seaman
- Alphonso Mayfield
- Guru Madhavan
- Nina Witoszek
- Rafael Wittek
- Gin Lieberman
