= Fredrik Barth =

Norwegian anthropologist (1928–2016)

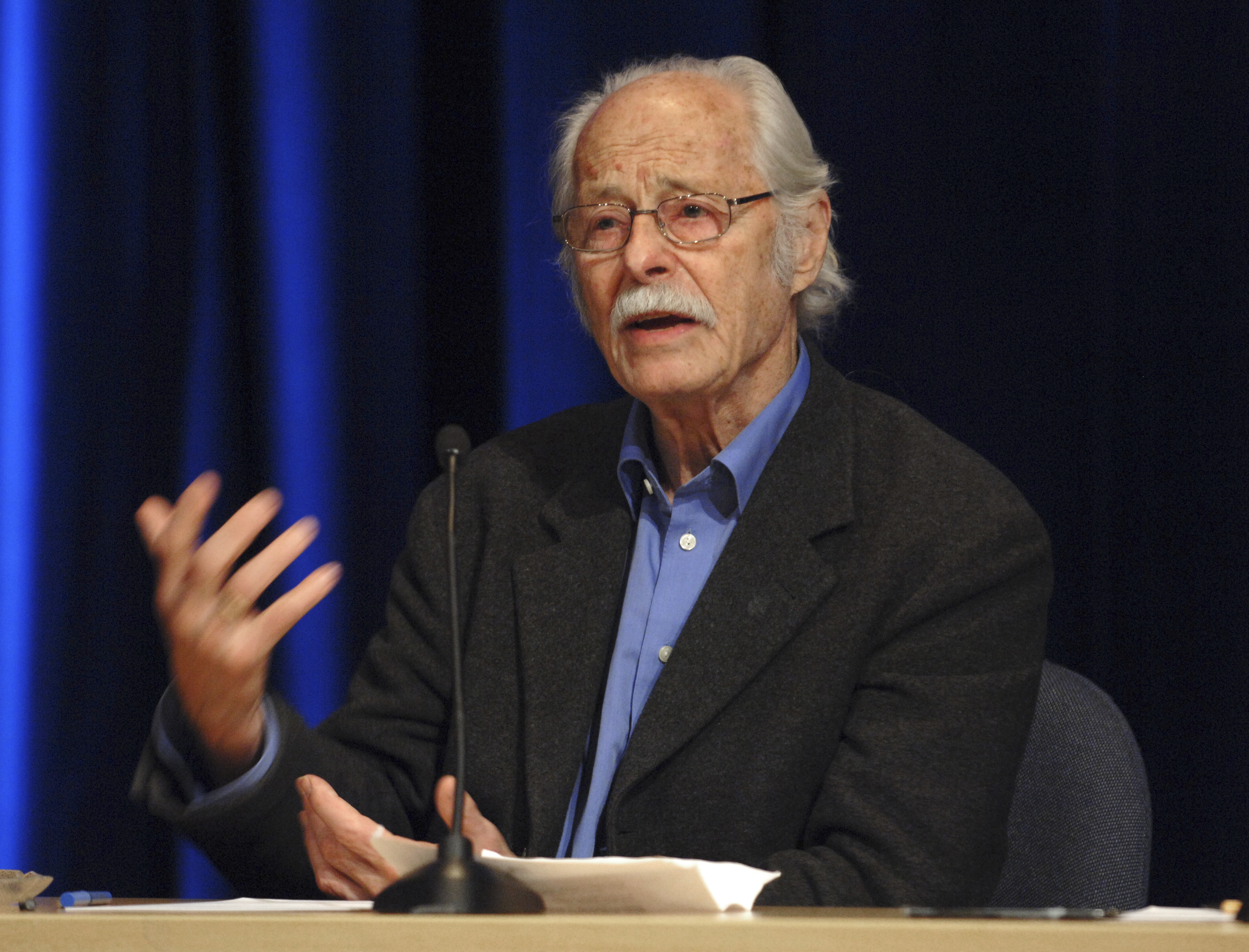
- Born: Thomas Fredrik Weybye Barth; 22 December 1928; Leipzig, Germany
- Died: 24 January 2016 (aged 87); Norway
- Education: University of Chicago (MA); Cambridge University (PhD)
- Spouse: Unni Wikan
- Scientific career
- Fields: Anthropology
- Workplaces: Boston University; University of Bergen
- Doctoral advisor: Edmund Leach

Thomas Fredrik Weybye Barth (22 December 1928 – 24 January 2016) was a Norwegian social anthropologist who published several ethnographic books with a clear formalist view. He was a professor in the Department of Anthropology at Boston University, and previously held professorships at the University of Oslo, the University of Bergen (where he founded the Department of Social Anthropology), Emory University and Harvard University. He was appointed a government scholar in 1985.

== Biography and major works ==
Barth was born in Leipzig, Germany to Thomas Barth, a professor of geology, and his wife Randi Thomassen. They also had a daughter. Barth and his sister grew up in Norway in an academic family. Their uncle was Edvard Kaurin Barth, a professor of zoology. Fredrik Barth developed an interest in evolution and human origins. When his father was invited to give a lecture at the University of Chicago, the younger man accompanied him and decided to attend the university, enrolling in 1946. He earned an MA in paleoanthropology and archaeology in 1949.

After receiving his MA, Barth returned to Norway, keeping a connection to Chicago faculty. In 1951 he joined an archaeological expedition to Iraq led by Robert Braidwood. Barth stayed on after the expedition was over, and conducted ethnographic population studies with the Kurdish population. He spent a year at the London School of Economics (LSE) writing up this data, and in 1953 published his first book, Principles of Social Organization in Southern Kurdistan.

Barth had originally planned to submit the manuscript of his Principles of Social Organization as his Ph.D. dissertation, but was unsuccessful in doing so. He continued graduate study, moving to Cambridge, England to study with Edmund Leach, whom he had previously worked with at the LSE. For his PhD, Barth conducted fieldwork in Swat, Pakistan; his completed dissertation was published in 1959 as Political Leadership among Swat Pathan. Shortly afterwards, he was part of a UNESCO study of pastoral nomadism which focused on the Basseri in what is now Iran. From this work, he published the 1961 monograph Nomads of South Persia.

In 1961, Barth was invited to the University of Bergen to create an anthropology department and serve as the chair. This important and prestigious position gave him the opportunity to introduce British-style social anthropology to Norway. The only other existing anthropology program, at the University of Oslo, was older and connected to the university's ethnographic museum (now the Museum of Cultural History). It was based in Victorian folklore and museum approaches. By founding the department at Bergen, Barth hoped to create a modern, world-class department with an approach similar to those found in England and the United States.

Barth remained at Bergen from 1961 to 1972. During this time his own work developed in two key ways. First, he developed research projects inside Norway (and published a study entitled The Role of the Entrepreneur in Social Change in Northern Norway in 1963). Second, he began writing more purely theoretical works that secured his international reputation within anthropology. These included Models of Social Organization (1966) and especially the small, edited volume, Ethnic Groups and Boundaries: The Social Organization of Cultural Difference (1969). Barth's introduction to Ethnic Groups and Boundaries became his most well-known essay and "ended up among the top 100 on the social science citation index for a number of years.".

In 1974 Barth moved to Oslo, where he became professor of social anthropology and head of the city's Museum of Cultural History. During this period, anthropology was changing. Marxism and interpretive approaches were becoming more central while Barth's focus on strategy and choice was being taken up by economics and related disciplines. Barth shifted to studying meaning and ritual as developed in ethnic groups, and conducted research in Papua New Guinea, where he conducted fieldwork with the Baktaman. He published several works from these studies, namely the Ritual and Knowledge among the Baktaman of New Guinea (1975). He also continued studies in the Middle East, conducting fieldwork in Oman with his wife Unni Wikan. This resulted in his 1983 volume Sohar: Culture and Society in an Omani Town.

Barth received a state scholarship from the Norwegian government in 1985. He left the country to accept two positions in the United States—at Emory University from 1989 to 1996, and Boston University from 1997 to 2008. By this time, Barth and his wife "felt we had both done our share of physically strenuous fieldwork" and decided to begin an ethnographic project in Bali. He developed an interest in the anthropology of knowledge at around this time, an interest which he explored in his book Balinese Worlds (1993). More recently, he has also conducted research in Bhutan.

Barth was a member of the Norwegian Academy of Science and Letters. In 1997 he was elected a Foreign Honorary Member of the American Academy of Arts and Sciences.

== Personal life ==
Barth was married 1949–1972 to Mary ("Molly") Allee (27 April 1926 – December 1998), and he was married again 30 January 1974 to Unni Wikan, professor of social anthropology at the University of Oslo, Norway. His sister Tone Barth (25 January 1924 – 10 October 1980) was married 1945–1963 to Terkel Rosenqvist (1921–2011), also an academic, and she was married again in 1963 to the Norwegian politician for the Conservative Party Vidkunn Hveding (1921–2001). Barth died in Norway on 24 January 2016 at the age of 87.

== Main ideas and contributions ==
He was well known among anthropologists for his Transactionalism analysis of political processes in the Swat Valley of northern Pakistan, and his study of micro-economic processes and entrepreneurship in the area of Darfur in Sudan. The latter has been regarded as a classical example of formalist analysis in economic anthropology. During his long career, Barth has also published acclaimed studies based on field works in Bali, New Guinea, and several countries in the Middle East, thematically covering a wide array of subjects.

=== Ethnicity ===
Barth has been an influential scholar on the subject of ethnicity. Andreas Wimmer wrote in 2008, "The comparative study of ethnicity rests firmly on the ground established by Fredrik Barth in his well-known [1969] introduction to a collection of ethnographic case studies." As the editor of Ethnic Groups and Boundaries (1969), Barth outlined an approach to the study of ethnicity that focused on the ongoing negotiations of boundaries between groups of people. Barth's view was that such groups were not discontinuous cultural isolates, or logical a prioris to which people naturally belong.

Barth parted with anthropological notions of cultures as bounded entities, and ethnicity as primordial bonds. He focused on the interface and interaction between groups that gave rise to identities.

Ethnic Groups and Boundaries, which he edited, concentrates on the interconnections of ethnic identities. Barth writes in his introduction (p. 9):

... categorical ethnic distinctions do not depend on an absence of mobility, contact and information, but do entail social processes of exclusion and incorporation whereby discrete categories are maintained despite changing participation and membership in the course of individual life histories.

He emphasizes the use by groups of categories - i.e. ethnic labels - that usually endure even when individual members move across boundaries or share an identity with people in more than one group.

The inter-dependency of ethnic groups is a pivotal argument throughout both the introduction and the following chapters. As interdependent, ethnic identities are the product of continuous so-called ascription (Cf. Ascriptive inequality) and self-ascription, Barth stresses the interactional perspective of social anthropology on the level of the persons involved instead of on a socio-structural level. Ethnic identity becomes and is maintained through relational processes of inclusion and exclusion.

== Literature ==
Biographies

- Lewis, Herbert S. (2017). « L’anthropologue nomade : Biographie intellectuelle de Frederik Barth », in BEROSE - International Encyclopaedia of the Histories of Anthropology, Paris.
- Thomas Hylland Eriksen Fredrik Barth: An intellectual biography University of Chicago Press 2015 ISBN 9780745335360

Selected bibliography

- Balinese worlds. Chicago: University of Chicago Press, 1993. ISBN 0-226-03833-5
- Cosmologies in the making : a generative approach to cultural variation in inner New Guinea. Cambridge: Cambridge University Press, 1987. ISBN 0-521-34279-1
- Sohar, culture and society in an Omani town. Baltimore: Johns Hopkins University Press, 1983. ISBN 0-8018-2840-6
- Ritual and knowledge among the Baktaman of New Guinea. Oslo: Universitetsforlaget, 1975. ISBN 0-300-01816-9
- Ethnic groups and boundaries. The social organization of culture difference. Oslo: Universitetsforlaget, 1969. ISBN 978-0-04-572019-4 (Reissued Long Grove, IL: Waveland Press, 1998)
- Models of social organization. London, Royal Anthropological Institute, 1966.
- Nomads of South-Persia; the Basseri tribe of the Khamseh Confederacy. Oslo: Universitetsforlaget, 1962.
- Political leadership among Swat Pathans. London : The Athlone Press, 1959.
