= David F. Bjorklund =

American professor of psychology

David Fredrick Bjorklund
- Born: 1949 (age 76–77)
- Education: University of North Carolina at Chapel Hill

David Fredrick Bjorklund (born June 13, 1949) is an American developmental psychologist and professor of psychology at Florida Atlantic University. His research focuses on children's cognitive development, memory, learning strategies, and evolutionary developmental psychology. He has contributed to the development of evolutionary approaches to child psychology and has examined the implications of children's evolved learning abilities for education. He is the author and editor of several books and more than 230 scientific papers. He is the former editor in chief of the peer-reviewed Journal of Experimental Child Psychology.

== Biography ==
Bjorklund was born in Worcester, Massachusetts. He received a Ph.D. in 1976 from the University of North Carolina at Chapel Hill in Developmental psychology. Bjorklund joined the Department of Psychology at Florida Atlantic University in 1976 and became a professor in 1986. His academic work has included teaching and research in developmental and evolutionary psychology, as well as supervising graduate students.He served as coordinator of graduate studies in the department during several periods between 1982 and 2005 and as master teacher in the Charles E. Schmidt College of Science from 2008 to 2014. He became Associate Chair of the Department of Psychology in 2018.

He has held visiting academic appointments at the Max Planck Institute for Psychological Research in Munich, Germany in 1988 and 1990, the University of Georgia in 1993–1994, Emory University in 1994, and Universitat Jaume I in Spain in 2001. In 2002 and 2003, he held an Alexander von Humboldt research professorship at the University of Würzburg in Germany. In 2004, he was a visiting Erskine Fellow at the University of Canterbury in New Zealand.

He served as an associate editor of the journal Child Development from 1997 to 2001 and as editor-in-chief of the Journal of Experimental Child Psychology from 2007 through 2024. He was the inaugural editor for Cambridge Elements in Applied Evolutionary Science (Cambridge University Press) in 2021, and continues as co-editor.He has served on the board of the Evolution Institute since 2019 and was its vice president and an executive committee member from 2020 to 2023.

== Research ==
=== Cognitive development and children's memory ===
Bjorklund's early research examined the development of children's memory, knowledge, and cognitive strategies. He investigated how children learn to organize information, use mnemonic techniques, retrieve information, and how the effectiveness of these strategies varies with age and experience.

His work with Katherine Kipp Harnishfeger examined the mental effort involved in using organizational strategies during memory tasks. In later research with Thomas R. Coyle and Jane F. Gaultney, he investigated the utilization deficiency hypothesis: the finding that children may learn to use a memory strategy before they can apply it efficiently enough to improve their performance. This research addressed the distinction between acquiring a strategy and benefiting from its use.

Bjorklund also edited Children's Strategies: Contemporary Views of Cognitive Development (1990), a collection examining the development of strategies in memory, problem-solving, attention, reading, and mathematical thinking. His work in this area contributed to research on the relationships among children's knowledge, cognitive resources, and strategic behavior.

Multiple editions of his textbook, Children's Thinking: Cognitive Development and Individual Differences, address cognitive development and individual differences in children's thinking. He has also co-authored textbooks on child development and general psychology, extending his work in developmental psychology to undergraduate education.

=== Ontogenetic adaptations ===
Bjorklund's work in evolutionary developmental psychology examines ontogenetic adaptations, traits of infancy and childhood that may have evolved because they serve adaptive functions during particular stages of development, rather than solely preparing individuals for adulthood. He has discussed this concept in relation to childhood cognitive immaturity, play, neural plasticity, and learning. In contrast to deferred adaptations, which prepare children for later life stages, ontogenetic adaptations address challenges encountered during development itself.

His article with Anthony D. Pellegrini, “Child Development and Evolutionary Psychology” (2000) helped establish a framework for examining how evolutionary processes relate to human development throughout the lifespan. Bjorklund subsequently explored these ideas in research on the adaptive functions of childhood and in publications integrating developmental theory with evolutionary psychology.

=== Evolutionary developmental psychology ===
Bjorklund contributed to evolutionary developmental psychology, which applies evolutionary theory to human development. His work examined how evolved biological mechanisms interact with developmental processes and environmental conditions to influence children's cognition and behavior. He argued that evolutionary psychology should consider development across the lifespan, including childhood, rather than focus primarily on adults.

His books related to evolutionary developmental psychology include The Origins of Human Nature: Evolutionary Developmental Psychology (2002), co-authored with Anthony D. Pellegrini, How Children Invented Humanity: The Role of Development in Human Evolution (2021), and Origins of the Social Mind: Evolutionary Psychology and Child Development (2005), edited with Bruce J. Ellis. These works address the relationship between human development and evolution, including the possible adaptive functions of characteristics associated with childhood.

In the article “Incorporating Development Into Evolutionary Psychology: Evolved Probabilistic Cognitive Mechanisms” (2016), Bjorklund examined how evolved cognitive biases can interact with experience and developmental processes to produce adaptive outcomes. Using examples including social learning and tool use, he argued for greater integration of developmental concepts into evolutionary psychology.

His broader work connects developmental psychology with evolutionary explanations of childhood, learning, and human behavior, emphasizing the importance of studying cognitive abilities in the context of both individual development and the environments in which children grow.

=== Evolutionary educational psychology ===
Bjorklund has also examined the implications of evolutionary theory for education. His 2022 article, “Children's Evolved Learning Abilities and Their Implications for Education,” considered how evolved features of children's learning and cognition may inform educational theory and practice. The paper connects research on children's development with questions about how learning environments and educational approaches can take account of children's cognitive characteristics.

== Awards ==
Bjorklund received the Humboldt Research Award from the Alexander von Humboldt Foundation for 2001–2003 and an honorary doctorate from the University of Bern in Switzerland in 2015. The University of North Carolina at Chapel Hill awarded him its Department of Psychology Distinguished Alumnus Award in 2002.

His other awards include the Researcher of the Year award at Florida Atlantic University's Charles E. Schmidt College of Science in 2007, the Excellence in Graduate Mentoring Award in 2009, and the Scholar of the Year award at the professor level in 2016. He also received Florida Atlantic University awards for teaching and instructional excellence in 1989, 1994, 1996, and 1998. He was included in the Stanford–Elsevier list of the world's top 2% of scientists in 2021, 2022, 2023, 2024, 2025 and 2026.

== Books authored and edited ==
- Bjorklund, David F., ed. (1990). Children's Strategies: Contemporary Views of Cognitive Development. Psychology Press. ISBN 978-0805803150.
- Bjorklund, David F.; Bjorklund, Barbara R. (1992). Looking at Children: An Introduction to Child Development. Brooks/Cole Pub Co. ISBN 978-0534137045.
- Bjorklund, David F.; Pellegrini, Anthony (1998). Applied Child Study: A Developmental Approach (2nd ed.). Psychology Press. ISBN 978-0805807226.
- Bjorklund, David F.; Bjorklund, Barbara (1999). Parents Book of Discipline. Ballantine Books. ISBN 978-0345436405.
- Bjorklund, David F., ed. (2000). False-Memory Creation in Children and Adults: Theory, Research, and Implications. Psychology Press. ISBN 978-0805831696.
- Bjorklund, David F.; Pellegrini, Anthony D. (2002). The Origins of Human Nature: Evolutionary Developmental Psychology. Washington, D.C.: American Psychological Association. ISBN 978-1557988782.
- Bjorklund, David F.; Ellis, Bruce J., eds. (2005). Origins of the Social Mind: Evolutionary Psychology and Child Development. Guilford Press. ISBN 978-1593851033.
- Bjorklund, David F. (2007). Why Youth is Not Wasted on the Young: Immaturity in Human Development. Wiley-Blackwell. ISBN 978-1405149525.
- Gray, Peter; Bjorklund, David F. (2018). Psychology (8th ed.). New York: Worth Publishers. ISBN 978-1-319-01589-3.
- Bjorklund, David F. (2020). Child development in evolutionary perspective. Elements in child development (1st ed.). New York: Cambridge University Press. ISBN 978-1-108-86618-7.
- Baker-Ward, Lynne E.; Bjorklund, David F.; Coffman, Jennifer L., eds. (2021). The Development of Children's Memory: The Scientific Contributions of Peter A. Ornstein. Cambridge: Cambridge University Press. doi:10.1017/9781108871105. ISBN 978-1-108-83645-6.
- Hart, Sybil L.; Bjorklund, David F., eds. (2022). Evolutionary Perspectives on Infancy. Evolutionary Psychology (1st ed. 2022 ed.). Cham: Springer International Publishing. doi:10.1007/978-3-030-76000-7. ISBN 978-3-030-75999-5.
- Bjorklund, David F.; Hernández Blasi, Carlos (December 4, 2025). Child and Adolescent Development. Cambridge University Press. doi:10.1017/9781009363563. ISBN 978-1-009-36356-3.
- Bjorklund, David F. (October 18, 2022). Children′s Thinking: Cognitive Development and Individual Differences (8th ed.). SAGE Publications. ISBN 978-1-5443-6132-1.

== See also ==
- Evolutionary developmental psychology
