= Political demography =

Interplay of politics and population change

Political demography is the study of the relationship between politics and population change. Population change is driven by classic demographic mechanisms – birth, death, age structure, and migration.

However, in political demography, there is always scope for assimilation as well as boundary and identity change, which can redraw the boundaries of populations in a way that is not possible with biological populations. Typically, political-demographic projections can account for both demographic factors and transitions caused by social change. A notable leader in the area of sub-state population projection is the World Population Program of the International Institute of Applied Systems Analysis (IIASA) in Laxenburg, Austria.

Some of the issues which are studied in the context of political demography are: surges of young people in the developing world, significantly increasing aging in the developed world, and the impact of increasing urbanization. Political demographers study issues like population growth in a political context. A population's growth is impacted by the relative balance of variables like mortality, fertility and immigration.

Many of the present world's most powerful nations are aging quickly, largely as a result of major decreases in fertility rates and major increases in life expectancies. As the labor pools in these nations shrink, and spending on the elderly increases, their economies are likely to slow down. By 2050, the workforce in Japan and Russia are predicted to decrease by more than 30 percent, while the German workforce is expected to decline by 25 percent by that year. The governments of these countries have made financial commitments to the elderly in their populations which will consume huge percentages of their national GDP. For example, based on current numbers, more than 25% of the national GDPs of Japan, France and Germany will be consumed by these commitments by 2040.

== Political demography and evolution ==
Differential reproductive success is the mechanism through which evolution takes place. For much of human history this occurred through migrations and wars of conquest, with disease and mortality through famine and war affecting the power of empires, tribes and city-states. Differential fertility also played a part, though typically reflected resource availability rather than cultural factors. Though culture has largely usurped this role, some claim that differential demography continues to affect cultural and political evolution.

Some scholars believe there exists a form of "cultural selection" that will significantly affect future demographics due to significant differences in fertility rates between cultures that cannot be explained by factors such as income, such as within certain religious groups. In the book Shall the Religious Inherit the Earth?, Eric Kaufmann argues that demographic trends point to religious fundamentalists greatly increasing as a share of the population over the next century. From the perspective of evolutionary psychology, it is expected that selection pressure should occur for whatever psychological or cultural traits maximize fertility.

== Uneven transition, democratization and globalization ==
The demographic transition from the late eighteenth century onwards opened up the possibility that significant change could occur within and between political units. Though the writings of Polybius and Cicero in classical times bemoaned the low fertility of the patrician elite as against their more fecund barbarian competitors, differential fertility has probably only recently emerged as a central aspect of political demography.

This has come about due to medical advances which have lowered infant mortality while conquest migrations have faded as a factor in world history. Differences in immunity levels to infectious diseases between populations also play no major role in our age of modern medicine and widespread exposure to a common disease pool.

It is not so much the trajectory of demographic transition that counts as the fact that it has become more intense and uneven in the late twentieth century as it has spread into the developing world. Uneven transitions lend themselves to differential growth rates between contending groups. These changes are in turn, magnified by democratization, which entrenches majority rule and privileges the power of numbers in politics as never before.

Indeed, in many new democracies riven by ethnic and religious conflicts, elections are akin to censuses while groups seek to 'win the census'. Ethnic parties struggle to increase their constituencies through pronatalism ('wombfare'), oppose family planning, and contest census and election results.

=== Ethnic, national and civilizational conflict ===
One branch of political demography examines how differences in population growth between nation-states, religions, ethnic groups and civilizations affects the balance of power between these political actors. For instance, Ethiopia was projected to have a larger population than Russia in 2020, and while there were 3.5 Europeans per African in 1900, there will be four Africans for each European in 2050. Population has always counted for national power to some degree and it is unlikely that these changes will leave the world system unaffected.

The same dynamic can be witnessed within countries due to differential ethnic population growth. Irish Catholics in Northern Ireland increased their share of the population through higher birthrates and the momentum of a youthful age structure from 35 to nearly 50 percent of the total between 1965 and 2011. Similar changes, also affected by in- and out-migration, have taken place in, amongst others, the United States (Hispanics), Israel-Palestine (Jews and Arabs), Kosovo (Albanians), Lebanon (Shia, with decline of Christians) and Nagorno-Karabakh (Armenians).

In the US, the growth of Hispanics and Asians, and Hispanics' youthful age profile as against whites, has the potential to tilt more states away from the Republican Party. On the other hand, the fertility advantage of conservative over liberal white voters is significant and rising, thus the Republicans are poised to win a larger share of the white vote - especially over the very long run of 50 to 100 years. As the opposing parties become more and more polarized based on ethnicity, class, and sector in America, this demographic rift is bound to increase. In certain heavily diverse major cities in California, for example, this rift is already beginning to be put in the spotlight through the immigration crisis and increase of federal immigration officer presence in the region.

According to London-based scholar Eric Kaufmann, the high birth rates of religious fundamentalists as against seculars and moderates has contributed to an increase in religious fundamentalism and decrease of moderate religion within religious groups, as in Israel, the US and the Muslim Middle East. Kaufmann, armed with empirical from a number of countries, also posits that this will be further bolstered by the higher retention rates of religious fundamentalists, with individuals in religiously fundamentalist households less likely to become religiously non-observant than others. See also Religious demography § Religious demographics.

=== Migration and immigration politics ===
Political demography has become increasingly tied to the movements of migrants groups all around the globe. As the world becomes more globalized, governmental and non-governmental institutions have become increasingly aware of this truth and actively seek to control the ebb and flow of migrants in order to achieve a strategic advantage politically. Immigration has become a particularly significant issue in many democratic societies due to its connection to previously steadfast ideologies like patriotism and cultural identity. These feelings of cultural insecurity are valuable tools, as an anxious voter base that's apprehensive about a growing out-group is more likely to engage with right-leaning political groups and campaigns, which can be even further amplified if the region is under economic hardships. In countries such as the United States, the United Kingdom and Germany, demographic shifts caused by immigration have contributed to widespread and contentious debates surrounding citizenship, border security, and multiculturalism.

Diaspora communities have also become increasingly important political actors through remittances, lobbying, and transnational political participation. Transnational solidarity in the face of differing ideals within their new societies have proven to be quite effective within their niches, especially when it comes to achieving political influence and representation for their community all across the diaspora. As geographic space as a political tool is becoming more relevant and the distribution of ethnic groups is spreading to all corners of the world due to displacers like conflict, climate change, and economic instability, the importance of transnational ideals to those that migrate continue to compound, as it's a way to stay connected to the cultures that they come from.

== Age structure and politics ==
=== Youth bulges ===
A second avenue of inquiry considers age structures: be these 'youth bulges' or aging populations. Young populations are associated with a ratio of dependents to producers: a high proportion of the population under age 16 puts pressure on resources. A 'youth bulge' of those in the 16-30 bracket creates a different set of problems.

A large population of adolescents entering the labor force and electorate strains at the seams of the economy and polity, which were designed for smaller populations. This creates unemployment and alienation unless new opportunities are created quickly enough - in which case a 'demographic dividend' accrues because productive workers outweigh young and elderly dependents. Yet the 16-30 age range is associated with risk-taking, especially among males.

In general, youth bulges in developing countries are associated with higher unemployment and, as a result, a heightened risk of violence and political instability. For some, the transition to more mature age structures is almost a sine qua non for democratization.

=== Population aging ===
Population aging presents the obverse effect: older populations are less risk-taking and less prone to violence and instability. However, like those under-16, they place great strain on the social safety net, especially in countries committed to old-age provision and high-quality medical care.

Some observers believe that the advent of a much older planet, courtesy of below-replacement fertility in Europe, North America, China and much of the rest of Asia and Latin America, will produce a 'geriatric peace'. Others are concerned that population aging will bankrupt the welfare state and handicap western liberal democracies' ability to project power abroad to defend their interests. A more cautious climate could also herald slower economic growth, less entrepreneurship and reduced productivity in mature democracies.

However, some argue that older people in the developed world have much higher productivity, human capital and better health than their counterparts in developing countries, so the economic effects of population aging will be largely mitigated.

== Other branches of political demography ==
Other areas in political demography address the political impact of skewed sex ratios (typically caused by female infanticide or neglect), urbanization, global migration, and the links between population, environment and conflict

== Emerging discipline ==
The study of political demography is in its early stages and can be traced back to the works of figures such as Jack Goldstone, whom is often considered to be the father of Political Demography. Since 2000 the subject has drawn the attention of policymakers and journalists and is now emerging as an academic subfield. Panels on political demography appear at demography conferences such as the Population Association of America (PAA) and European Association for Population Studies (EAPS). There is now a political demography section at the International Studies Association. A number of important international conferences have also taken place since 2006 on the subject.

== See also ==
- White backlash
- Opposition to immigration
- Natalism
- Religious demography
- Quiverfull
- Jack Goldstone
- Philip Longman
- Myron Weiner
- Ben Wattenberg
- World population
- Demographic engineering
