= Cyclical industrial dynamics =

Study of patterns in specific industries that do not follow broader economic patterns

Industrial dynamics is the study of the means and processes through which industries change over time, through their own processes of evolution – as first analyzed by Joseph Schumpeter. It is the complementary study to that of an industry’s comparative statics, which still dominates economic analysis. Industrial dynamics, as studied by scholars such as Carlsson and Eliasson, reveal the basic underlying forces driving industry evolution. Some industries, particularly those with rapid product turnover or high levels of capital expenditure, reveal special dynamics moving through intrinsic upturns and downturns that are not necessarily related to the wider economic fluctuations. These are known as cyclical industrial dynamics. They have recently come under investigation in the specialized literature.

== Prevalence of industry cycles ==
Almost all industries exhibit cyclicality to some extent. Below are some examples where industry cycles have been particularly examined.

=== Commodities ===
The research by John Sterman finds that the so-called commodity cycles arise in many commodity markets. For example, price and production cycles in markets of hog, cattle and copper span 4 years, 10–12 years and 8–10 years each in average respectively. Margret Slade estimates that cycles in prices of metals including aluminum, copper, iron, lead, silver, tin, and zinc are about 10–14 years in duration, which is twice as long as the investment periods. The study by Thomas Stanback indicates a persistent cycle of approximately two years duration in the textile industry in the 1950s and 1960s. Alajoutsijärvi and colleagues report that the cycle in the German paper industry has shortened in duration since 1990, and is now about two or three years in length.

=== Durable goods ===
Based on his observations of the explicit cyclical movement in the shipbuilding industry, Nobel Prize-winning economist Jan Tinbergen believes the so-called ‘durable goods cycle’ is a result of the lag of the upstream industries such as shipbuilding in response to the cycles in end users markets such as that in freight rates. He further suggests that the cycle length of the upstream industry is four times the lag, and is about 17 years in the shipbuilding industry. Besides the traditional industries, many new industries such as semiconductors, flat panel displays, computers and telecommunications also exhibit strong cyclicality.

=== Services ===
In the service sector, for example, Choi and colleagues date the industry cycles of the US hotel industry and restaurant industry. They establish the mean duration of the business cycle, measured with aggregate activities in absolute level, as about 7.3 years for the U.S. hotel industry; and for the U.S. restaurant industry, as about 8 years.

== Industry cycles versus business cycles ==
Cyclical dynamics at the level of individual industries may present rather different patterns from those of the general business cycles. For example, while the fluctuations of many industries correlate with those in the aggregate economy, there were also many industries that are not sensitive to business cycles — such as the pharmaceutical, educational service, insurance carriers and public service industries; some other industries such as the health service industry even enjoy higher growth during recessions. In fact, it was estimated that "in any one recession [during the 1980s and the 1990s] only 60% of all industrial sectors were actually in a downturn."

The timing, duration and amplitude of industry cycles can vary widely. Durable goods industries in the US are approximately three times more cyclical than nondurable-goods industries.

== Identification and measurement of industry cycles ==
Industry cycles have been identified using either the ‘classical cycle’ approach or the ‘growth cycle’ approach. The former approach uses time series in levels of economic activities to define cycles; and only absolute decline in the activities qualifies as a ‘downturn’.

While this approach is consistent with the approach used by the National Bureau of Economic Research (NBER) to identify business cycles in the US, cycles at the industry level are usually concealed by strong industry trends which dominate industrial series. Therefore industry cycles are more commonly identified using the ‘growth cycle’ approach, by separating the cyclical component of a time series from the underlying trend.

Combining the growth cycle approach and other econometric techniques such as the Hodrick-Prescott filter, the industry cycles in the global semiconductor, PCs and flat panel display industries in the past decades are identified.

Industry cycles can be further measured using techniques such as the Fourier analysis. For example, three most powerful cycles of the global semiconductor shipment data in the frequency domain are identified, with an average period of 4 years, 2.29 years, and 1.03 years accordingly (reverting to the original time domain).

== Drivers of industry cycles ==
Three main mechanisms are suggested to be responsible for industry cycles, namely industry cycles caused by business cycles; industry cycles caused by mismatch and delay between different market dynamics including investment, capacity, price and sales; and industry cycles caused by the dynamics of innovation.

Many industries boom when the aggregate economy is prosperous and bust when the economy is in recession. In other words, industry cycles of many industries in a given country are correlated with the business cycles of the country. For other industries, mismatch and delay between different dynamics in markets is another important mechanism causing industry cycles. The Bullwhip effect at firm-level and game-like competition at industry-level can cause the sequential boom-bust movement in price, sales, capacity and investment in many industries. Finally, uneven pace of technology change appears to be another main driver of industry cycles as sales in an industry are likely to peak after a ‘dominant design’ has emerged.

== Strategic implications of industry cycles ==
Some industrial dynamics can be better understood through the lens of industry cycles. For example, it has been found that industries become more concentrated during the industry cycle downturns. This phenomenon is consistent with the theory of Joseph Schumpeter which views downturns as providing a mechanism of ‘cleansing’ which allocates the resources to stronger competitors in the industry.

Cyclical industrial dynamics constitute a key strategic setting for firms and thus bring many important implications to strategy-making of firms. For example, in the highly cyclical oil-well drilling industry, it has been suggested that, first, companies did adjust their strategic activities such as capital expenditure and asset allocation according to the stage of the cycle, and second, ‘optimal’ strategies varied across cycle stages. In the highly cyclical flat panel display industry, where there have been five upturns and downturns since the industry began in 1990, John Mathews demonstrated that there is a striking pattern in firms’ entry behavior, where not a single successful entry was engineered during an industry upturn. In the marketing literature, the pattern where firms are found to utilize recessions as times to enhance the standing of their brand, has also been noted.
