= Structural-demographic theory =

Theoretical framework in sociology

In social science, the structural-demographic theory (SDT, also known as Demographic Structural Theory) uses mathematical modeling to explain and predict outbreaks of political instability in complex societies. It originated in the work of sociologist Jack Goldstone and has recently been developed further by the quantitative historians Peter Turchin, Andrey Korotayev, Leonid Grinin and Sergey Nefedov.

== Theory ==
As applied by Peter Turchin and colleagues, SDT divides historically observed societies into four components: the state, elites, the general population, and one processual component designed to measure political instability. These four components are each subdivided into different attributes, which fluctuate dynamically and influence one another through a series of feedback loops. For instance, the theory takes into account the numbers and composition of elites, the age structure and degree of urbanization of the general population, and the revenues and expenditures of the state. It also includes an ideological aspect, tracking the prevalence of ‘prosocial’ norms promoting cooperation as well as ‘radical ideologies’, understood as inherently socially disruptive.

== History ==
As a graduate student in the late 1970s and early 1980s, Goldstone noted a persistent pattern: in the decades leading up to major historical outbreaks of political instability, such as the string of revolutions in France, the Netherlands, and America in the late 18th century or the Taiping Rebellion in China (1850–1864), the societies in question had experienced substantial population growth, leading to a 'youth bulge' and to rapid urbanization. This association had been noted by a number of historians, but had not yet been systematically explored in the context of global demography and the history of revolutions and civil war. The structural-demographic theory emerged from his attempts to apply the insights of political demography to the study of revolutions in world history.

A major contribution to the SDT has been made by Andrey Korotayev and his colleagues who developed their structural-demographic model of "A Trap at the Escape from the Trap" that demonstrated that the emergence of major sociopolitical upheavals at the escape from the Malthusian trap is not an abnormal, but a regular phenomenon.
