= Computational politics =

Intersection between computer science and political science

Computational politics is the intersection between computer science and political science. The area involves the usage of computational methods, such as analysis tools and prediction methods, to present the solutions to political sciences questions. Researchers in this area use large sets of data to study user behavior. Common examples of such works are building a classifier to predict users' political bias in social media or finding political bias in the news. This discipline is closely related with digital sociology. However, the main focus of computational politics is on political related problems and analysis.

Computational politics is often used in political campaigns to target individuals for advertising purposes. Recently, the new trends of Generative Artificial Intelligence have transformed the political campaigns around the world; such tools and technologies give more modalities to users and politicians for political participation, along with a rise in disinformation.

== Methods and applications ==
While there is no clearly defined data source for research done in computational politics, the most common sources are social networking websites and political debate transcripts. Various methods are used to computationally model the behavior of agents. Social network analysis is often used to model and analyze data from social networking sites, with nodes on a graph representing individual users and edges representing varying forms of interaction between users. Natural language processing methods are used for text-based data, such as text from social media posts and political debate transcripts. For example, sentiment analysis, where algorithms are used to classify a piece of text as positive, negative, or neutral in sentiment, can be used to predict social media users' opinions on political parties or candidates. Various other machine learning algorithms are used to predict political bias in news sources, political affiliation of users of social networks, and whether political news articles are fake news or not. Computational models are often used to examine cognitive behavior associated with political contexts, including the connection between the brain and polarization or ideological thinking.

== Early history ==
The first prominent involvement of computing in politics occurred during a live CBS broadcast on November 4, 1952, when Remington Rand's UNIVAC I computer predicted that Eisenhower would win 438 electoral votes to Stevenson's 93 after analyzing 3 million votes. The final result was 442 to 89, less than 1% error.

During the 1950s political science became an independent discipline, with Ithiel de Sola Pool coining social network theory and developing methodologies that would influence the field for decades. His collaboration with Robert Abelson at Yale produced the first systematic computer simulations of electoral behavior, creating mathematical models that could predict voter responses to different campaign strategies.

In 1959, Ed Greenfield founded the private U.S. data science firm Simulmatics Corporation with Pool as head of research. Simulmatics developed "The People Machine"—an IBM 704 computer system using Fortran programming to analyze voter behavior through sophisticated demographic modeling.

The 1960 presidential election marked the first systematic deployment of computing to influence a major campaign outcome. Simulmatics divided American voters into 480 distinct demographic categories, analyzing archived interviews from 130,000 respondents to predict how different groups would respond to specific messages and policy positions. The computer analysis concluded that Kennedy could win despite anti-Catholic sentiment and that supporting civil rights would ultimately benefit the campaign by mobilizing Black voters.

The 1960s witnessed rapid expansion of academic research in computational politics. Harold Guetzkow published "Simulation in International Relations" in 1963, extending computer modeling to foreign policy analysis. In 1965, Pool, Abelson, and Samuel Popkin published their seminal work Candidates, Issues, and Strategies: A Computer Simulation of the 1960 and 1964 Presidential Elections, providing the first comprehensive documentation of electoral simulation methodologies.

The Pentagon's 1966-1968 contract with Simulmatics to analyze Vietnamese civilian attitudes and develop propaganda strategies provides an early example of computing's limitations in political contexts. The project failed due to cultural barriers and oversimplified human behavior modeling, leading to the company's bankruptcy in 1970.

== Usage in political campaigns ==
The discipline of computational politics has emerged with growing use of social media and recent breakthroughs in computational methods. Social media has provided scientific researchers and campaign strategists with an unprecedented scale of latent, user-generated data, and there have been recent developments in computer science to store and manage large collections of data. Computational politics represents a large shift in political science research, as lots of information can be efficiently collected on individuals rather than aggregates. This information can be used to effectively target likely voters. One of the first political campaigns to use computational politics was Barack Obama's 2012 campaign. An example of a data source used in the campaign was user data from a Facebook App created for it. The campaign developed a "likelihood of turnout" index to focus turning out voters who were already likely to prefer Obama. Since then, there has been a growing number of political data firms, which are private companies that sell voter registration tied to consumer data. One such data firm is i360, which is funded by the Koch brothers. Numerous clients of i360 saw victories in the 2014 United States Midterm Elections.

=== Criticism ===
Campaign strategies relating to computational politics have been met with criticism. Some researchers raise concerns about voter privacy that come with new methods of targeting individual voters, as there is a lack of regulation surrounding protection of consumer data in the United States. They highlight the information asymmetry that comes with the large amount of data that campaigns have concerning individual voters, while the voters don't know exactly what the campaigns are doing with their information. According to these researchers, the black box nature of the algorithms that handle voter data exacerbate this issue, as it is difficult to understand how data is being processed by the algorithms. Zeynep Tufekci, professor and sociologist, believes the information asymmetry caused by recent developments in computational politics will harm political discourse in the public sphere, particularly in interactions between political campaigns and voters, as ideas may be weighted less heavily for their own merit and more heavily based on who presents the idea, given the information political campaigns have on their potential voters. These researchers also address the issues of discrimination that are rising with computational politics, as individuals who are predicted by models to be less likely to vote could be ignored in political marketing and outreach entirely. Tufecki states that political campaigns can present different advertisements based on which messages the potential voter is likely to be sympathetic to, allowing politicians to base their platform off of small issues that will efficiently mobilize niche groups of voters, while less focus may be spent on larger, more broadly important issues. Kwame Akosah, a voting rights advocate, writes that algorithms can be used to discriminate against protected classes. Additionally, he states that the knowledge of individuals being tracked by data brokers can create a chilling effect in political discourse. Polarisation and privacy have been well-discussed issues in this domain, however, the massive adaptability of social media platforms has attracted the organised use of social media for opinion engineering during crisis, as seen in Russia-Ukraine 2022 or natural crisis like COVID-19 pandemic. Such use of social media is associated with Information warfare and has raised questions on the ethics and regulation of data ownership, fair algorithms, and the use of jury based methods for the content moderation.

== See also ==
- Computational propaganda
