= Alexandre Deulofeu =

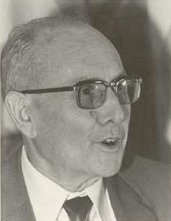
Alexandre Deulofeu Torres

Alexandre Deulofeu i Torres (20 September 1903, in L'Armentera – 27 December 1978, in Figueres) was a Catalan politician and philosopher of history. He wrote about what he called the Mathematics of History, a cyclical theory on the evolution of civilizations.

== Biography ==
Deulofeu was born at l'Armentera in the province of Girona, Catalonia, where his father was a pharmacist. When he was three years old his family moved to Sant Pere Pescador, and then to Figueres nine years later.

He attended high school at the Institut Ramon Muntaner of Figueres. Later he studied pharmacy and chemistry in Madrid, completing his studies in chemistry in Barcelona. Once back in Figueres, after a competitive examination he was awarded a teaching post at the Institute of Figueres. At the same time, he became strongly involved in politics. First he was a leader of the Republican Nationalist Youth in Empordà and afterwards he became a town councilor of the independentist party ERC (Esquerra Republicana de Catalunya). During the Spanish Civil War he became mayor of Figueres by chance, and while serving in this office he tried to keep the peace, and prevent looting and political witch hunts. He also served in the Republican Army as a health officer.

On 5 February 1939, Deulofeu accompanied the defeated republican forces into exile where he followed several trades: working as a teacher of various subjects; experimenting with farming, particularly hydroponics inventing his own growth solutions; working as a bricklayer, as a factory worker, and as a writer and poet.

He played the violin and the saxophone in several music groups, both modern and classical.

After returning from exile on 22 January 1947 he dedicated himself to pharmacy, carried out research and continued to write, although he died without finishing the extended version of his main work, Mathematics of History. During his life he was friends with Francesc Pujols and Salvador Dalí.

== Theories ==
Deulofeu argued that civilizations and empires go through cycles which correspond to the natural cycles of living beings. Each civilization passes through a minimum of three 1700-year cycles. As part of civilizations, empires have an average lifespan of 550 years. He also stated that by knowing the nature of these cycles, it could be possible to modify the cycles in such a way that change could be peaceful instead of leading to war. He wanted mankind to modify the cycles and bring about a universal confederation of free people.

His mathematical laws related to the evolution of people can be summarized as below (Chapter III of Mathematics of History, 1967 edition):

1. All people pass through alternating periods of demographic division and periods of unification or imperialism.
2. The periods of great division last six centuries and a half. The periods of great unification last ten centuries and a half. Therefore, the evolutionary cycle comprises seventeen centuries.
3. During this evolutionary process people go through clearly defined phases, finding themselves at the end of the cycle in the same position as in the beginning.
4. The evolutionary cycle encompasses all types of human activity, besides considering political cycles we must also consider social, artistic, philosophical and scientific cycles.
5. All people follow the same evolution more or less rapidly depending on the geographic characteristics of each country.
6. Not all people display the same creative impulse. In each cycle there are periods of maximum creativity and these periods continue from one cycle to the next. In Europe, this passes in the Mediterranean from the East to West and then from the Iberian Peninsula to Gaul, then to the British Isles and on to the Germanic people and finally reaching the Northern and Slavic people.
7. The imperialist nuclei, which give rise to periods of strong political unification, follow identical organic processes, which last five to six centuries.
8. The transformation of sociopolitical regimes does not take place following a constant upward or downward trend, but by means of forward and backward steps, each being alternatively more intense than the others. This results in a broken line, which is an advancement in a given direction. It is what is called The Law of two steps forward and one backwards.

Deulofeu's thoughts are related to the ideas of Oswald Spengler and Arnold J. Toynbee, who also theorised on the cyclical character of civilizations, but not in the same precise mathematical way as Deulofeu.

A lifelong visitor of museums, temples and monuments in different countries, Deulofeu believed he had found the origin of Romanesque art, during the 9th century, in an area between Empordà and Roussillon, which he argued was the cradle of the second cycle of western European civilization.

== Sources ==
- Alexandre Deulofeu. Figueres, town council of Figueres, Institut d'Estudis Empordanesos, Patronat Francesc Eiximenis, 2003.
- Juli Gutiérrez Deulofeu. Alexandre Deulofeu, la Matemàtica de la Història (Alexandre Deulofeu, the Mathematics of History). Barcelona, Llibres de l’Índex / Neopàtria, 2004.
- Enric Pujol, Jordi Casassas, Francesc Roca, Juli Gutiérrez Deulofeu. La Matemàtica de la Història. La teoria cíclica d’Alexandre Deulofeu (Mathematics of History. The cyclic theory of Alexandre Deulofeu), Figueres, Brau Edicions, 2005.
- Ferdinando Angeletti, Storicismo matematico e pacifismo scientifico: due esempi di determinismo storico della metà del XX secolo in Iconografie europee di Walter Montanari e Shirin Zakeri (a cura di), Roma, Nuova Cultura 2021, ISBN 9788833653686;
