= Peter Turchin =

Russian-American scientist (born 1957)

Peter Turchin FAAAS
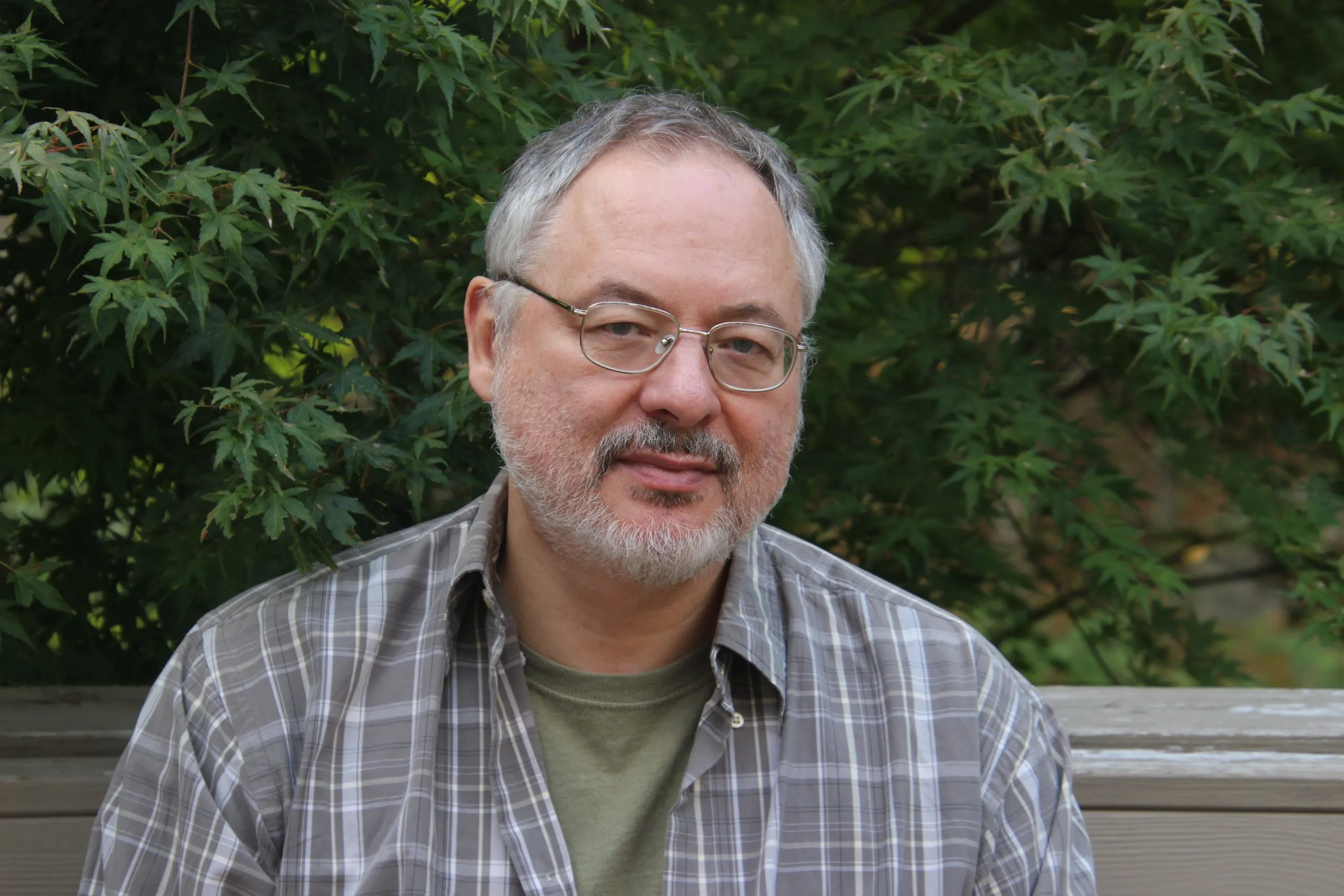
- Born: 22 May 1957 (age 69); Obninsk, Russia, Soviet Union
- Known for: Contributions to macrohistory and historical dynamics (cliodynamics)

Academic background
- Education: New York University, Duke University, Moscow State University
- Thesis: The effect of host-plant dispersion on movement of Mexican bean beetles (Epilachna varivestis) (1985)

Academic work
- Discipline: Cliodynamics (historical dynamics), mathematical modeling of long-term social processes, construction and analysis of historical databases
- Institutions: University of Connecticut, Evolution Institute, Complexity Science Hub Vienna
- Website: www.peterturchin.com

Peter Valentinovich Turchin (/ˈtɜːrtʃɪn/ Russian: Пётр Валенти́нович Турчи́н ; born 22 May 1957) is a Russian-American scientist who specializes in an area of study he and his colleagues developed called cliodynamics—mathematical modeling and statistical analysis of the dynamics of historical societies.

Turchin is an emeritus professor at the University of Connecticut in the departments of ecology and evolutionary biology and mathematics. He is a project leader at the Complexity Science Hub Vienna and a research associate at the School of Anthropology of the University of Oxford.

He was editor-in-chief and remains a member of the editorial board at Cliodynamics: The Journal of Quantitative History and Cultural Evolution. Turchin is a founding director of the Seshat: Global History Databank. He was a director of the Evolution Institute. In 2021, he was elected a fellow of the American Association for the Advancement of Science (FAAAS).

== Early life and education ==
Peter Turchin was born in 1957 in Obninsk, Russian SFSR, and in 1964 he moved with his family to Moscow. In 1975 he enrolled at Moscow State University's Faculty of Biology and studied there until 1977, when his father, Soviet dissident Valentin Turchin, was exiled from the Soviet Union. In 1980 Turchin received a B.A. degree (cum laude) in biology from New York University, and in 1985 a Ph.D. in zoology from Duke University. While Turchin's training is as a theoretical biologist, he holds no degrees in history.

== Career ==
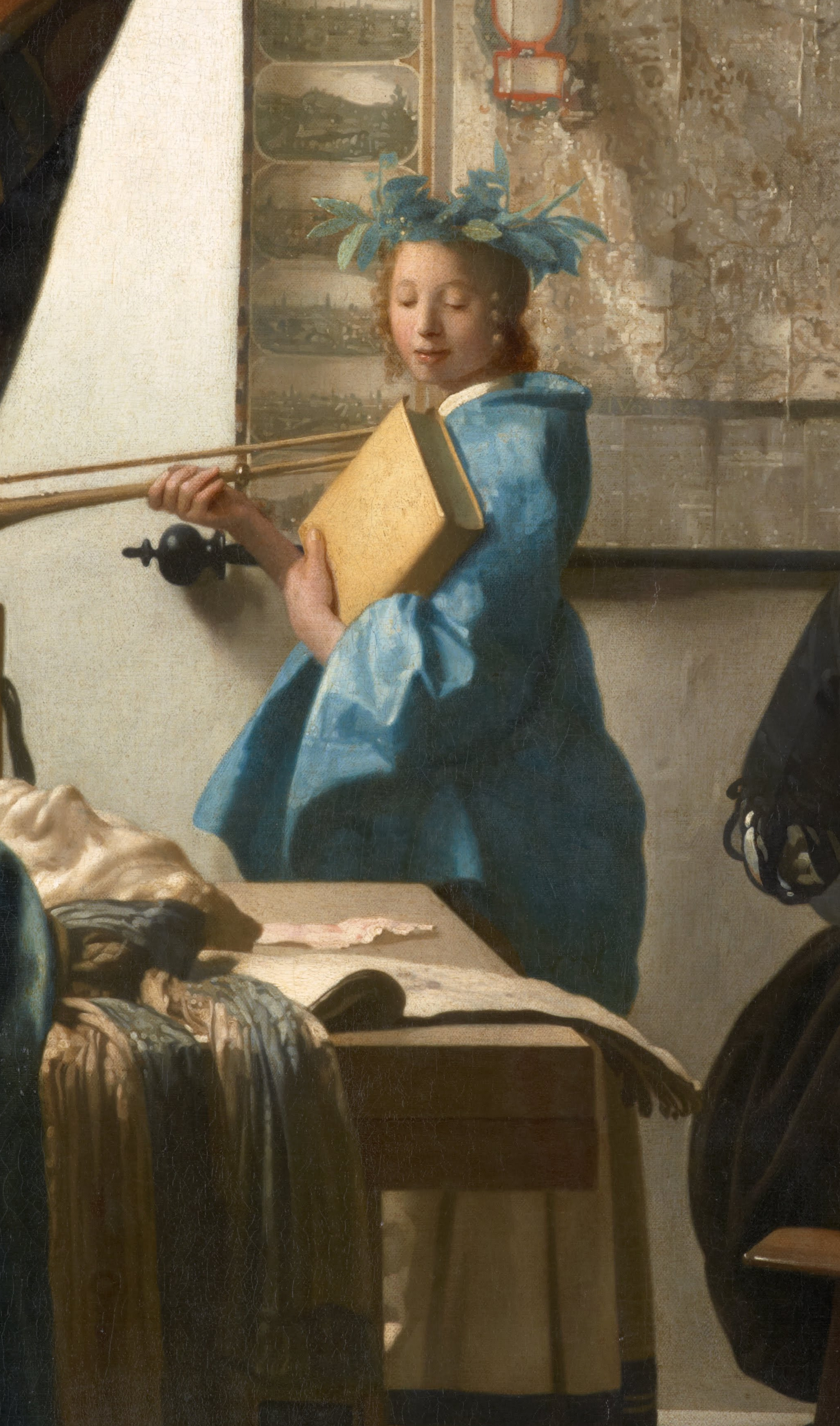
Clio—detail from The Allegory of Painting by Johannes Vermeer

Throughout his career Turchin has made contributions to various fields, such as economic history and historical dynamics. He is one of the founders of cliodynamics, the scientific discipline at the intersection of historical macrosociology, cliometrics, and mathematical modeling of social processes. Turchin developed an original theory explaining how large historical empires evolve by the mechanism of multilevel selection. His research on secular cycles has contributed to our understanding of the collapse of complex societies as has his re-interpretation of Ibn Khaldun's notion of asabiyya as "collective solidarity".

One of Turchin's most prominent fields of research is his study of the hypothesis that population pressure causes increased warfare. Turchin, in collaboration with Korotayev, has shown that negative results do not falsify the population-warfare hypothesis. Population and warfare are dynamical variables. If their interaction causes sustained oscillations, then we do not in general expect to find strong correlation between the two variables measured at the same time (that is, unlagged). Turchin and Korotayev have explored mathematically what the dynamical patterns of interaction between population and warfare (focusing on internal warfare) might be in stateless and state societies.

Next, they tested the model predictions in several empirical case studies: early modern England, Han and Tang China, and the Roman Empire. Their empirical results have lent support to the population-warfare theory: Turchin and Korotayev have found that there is a tendency for population numbers and internal warfare intensity to oscillate with the same period but shifted in phase, with warfare peaks following population peaks. They demonstrated that the rates of change of the two variables behave precisely as predicted by the theory: population rate of change is negatively affected by warfare intensity, while warfare rate of change is positively affected by population density.

In 2010, Turchin published research using 40 combined social indicators to predict that there would be worldwide social unrest in the 2020s. He subsequently cited the success of Donald Trump's 2016 presidential campaign as evidence that "negative trends seem to be accelerating" and that there has been an "unprecedented collapse of social norms governing civilized discourse". In 2020, Turchin and Jack Goldstone predicted that political and civic unrest in the United States would continue regardless of the party in power, until a leader took action to reduce inequality and improve the social indicators that are tracked in their research.

== Elite overproduction ==
Elite overproduction is a concept developed by Peter Turchin that describes the condition of a society that has an excess supply of potential elite members relative to its ability to absorb them into the power structure. This, he hypothesizes, is a cause for social instability, as those left out of power feel aggrieved by their relatively low socioeconomic status.

Turchin first described his theory in a 2010 letter to Nature. In it he stated, "The next decade is likely to be a period of growing instability in the United States and western Europe." Turchin likened this to "a forest in which deadwood has been accumulating for many years. We don’t know what will start the fire – it could be a lightning strike during a storm, or a careless match thrown away. But sooner or later such a precipitating spark will arrive, and there will be a massive conflagration."

In Ages of Discord, Turchin offered historical examples of both violent and non-violent ends of elite overproduction. The Progressive Era, New Deal, and continuing with the decades following World War II in the United States were, according to Turchin, a notably non-violent resolution in the United States of this problem achieved by a ruling class who had learned from previous calamity that mitigating economic inequality was what was required to forestall crisis.

According to Turchin and Jack Goldstone, periods of political instability have throughout human history been due to the purely self-interested behavior of the elite. They state that when the economy faced an expansion in the workforce, exerting a downward pressure on wages, the elite generally kept much of the wealth generated to themselves, resisting taxation and income redistribution. Thus, according to Turchin and Goldstone, in the face of intensifying competition, they also sought to restrict upward mobility to preserve their power and status for their descendants. They hypothesize that these actions exacerbate inequality, therefore driving sociopolitical turbulence.

== Works ==
Turchin has published over 200 scientific articles, including more than a dozen in Nature, Science, or PNAS, and at least eight books. He is the founder of the journal, Cliodynamics: The Journal of Quantitative History and Cultural Evolution, "...dedicated to 'the search for general principles explaining the functioning and dynamics of historical societies'", and manages a blog, Cliodynamica.

=== Books ===
- Turchin, Peter (1998). Quantitative Analysis of Movement: Measuring and Modeling Population Redistribution in Animals and Plants. Sinauer Associates. ISBN 978-0878938476.
- Turchin, Peter (2003). Complex Population Dynamics: A Theoretical/Empirical Synthesis. Princeton University Press. ISBN 978-0691090214.
- Turchin, Peter (2003). Historical Dynamics: Why States Rise and Fall. Princeton University Press. ISBN 978-0691116693.
- Turchin, Peter (2007). War and Peace and War: The Rise and Fall of Empires. Plume. ISBN 978-0452288195.
- Turchin, Peter; Nefedov, Sergey A. (2009). Secular Cycles. Princeton University Press. ISBN 978-0691136967.
- Turchin, P. (2016), Ultrasociety: How 10,000 Years of War Made Humans the Greatest Cooperators on Earth, Beresta Books, ISBN 978-0996139519.
- Turchin, Peter (2016). Ages of Discord: A Structural-Demographic Analysis of American History. Beresta Books. ISBN 978-0996139540.
- Turchin, Peter; Hoyer, Daniel (2020). Figuring Out the Past; The 3,495 Vital Statistics that Explain World History. Economist Books. ISBN 9781541762688.
- Turchin, Peter (2023). End Times: Elites, Counter-Elites and the Path of Political Disintegration. Allen Lane. ISBN 978-0241553480.
- Turchin, Peter (2025). The Great Holocene Transformation: What Complexity Science Tells Us about the Evolution of Complex Societies. Beresta Books. ISBN 978-1967343089.

=== Selected journal articles ===
- Turchin, P.; Taylor, A. D. & Reeve, J. D. (1999), "Dynamical role of predators in population cycles of a forest insect: an experimental test", Science, 285 (5430): 1068–1071, doi:10.1126/science.285.5430.1068, PMID 10446053
- Turchin, P.; Oksanen, L.; Ekerholm, P.; Oksanen, T. & Henttonen, H. (2000), "Are lemmings prey or predators?", Nature, 405 (6786): 562–565, Bibcode:2000Natur.405..562T, doi:10.1038/35014595, PMID 10850713, S2CID 1945851
- Burtsev, M.; Turchin, P. (2006), "Evolution of cooperative strategies from first principles", Nature, 440 (7087): 1041–1044, Bibcode:2006Natur.440.1041B, doi:10.1038/nature04470, PMID 16625195, S2CID 4340926
- Turchin P. (2006). Population Dynamics and Internal Warfare: A Reconsideration. Social Evolution & History 5(2): 112–147 (with Andrey Korotayev).
- Turchin, P. (2009), "Long-term population cycles in human societies" ( (PDF)), in Ostfeld, R. S.; Schlesinger, W. H. (eds.), The Year in Ecology and Conservation Biology, 2009, pp. 1–17, archived from the original on 21 July 2011
- Turchin, P.; Scheidel, W. (2009), "Coin Hoards Speak of Population Declines in Ancient Rome", PNAS, 106 (4): 17276–17279, Bibcode:2009PNAS..10617276T, doi:10.1073/pnas.0904576106, PMC 2762679, PMID 19805043
- Turchin, P.; Currie, T.E.; Turner, E.A.; Gavrilets, S. (2013). "War, space, and the evolution of Old World complex societies". Proc Natl Acad Sci U S A. 110 (41): 16384–9. Bibcode:2013PNAS..11016384T. doi:10.1073/pnas.1308825110. PMC 3799307. PMID 24062433.
- Whitehouse, H.; François, P.; Savage, P.; Currie, T.; Feeney, K.; Cioni, E.; Purcell, R.; Ross, R.; Larson, J.; Baines, J.; Ter Haar, B.; Covey, A.; Turchin, P. (2019). "Complex societies precede moralizing gods throughout world history". Nature. 568 (7751): 226–229. Bibcode:2019Natur.568..226W. doi:10.1038/s41586-019-1043-4. hdl:10871/36936. PMID 30894750. S2CID 84186554. (Retracted, see doi:10.1038/s41586-021-03656-3, PMID 34234342, Retraction Watch) (Article retracted on July 7, 2021)
- Explaining the rise of moralizing religions: A test of competing hypotheses using the Seshat Databank. Religion, Brain & Behavior, 2023, 13(2), 167-194.

== See also ==
- Historic recurrence
- Seshat (project)
- Structural-demographic theory
- Power struggle
- Credentialism
  - Managerial class
- Toynbee's theory of social decay
- Capital in the Twenty-First Century
  - Brahmin Left
- Joseph Tainter
