= David Sloan Wilson =

American biologist (born 1949)

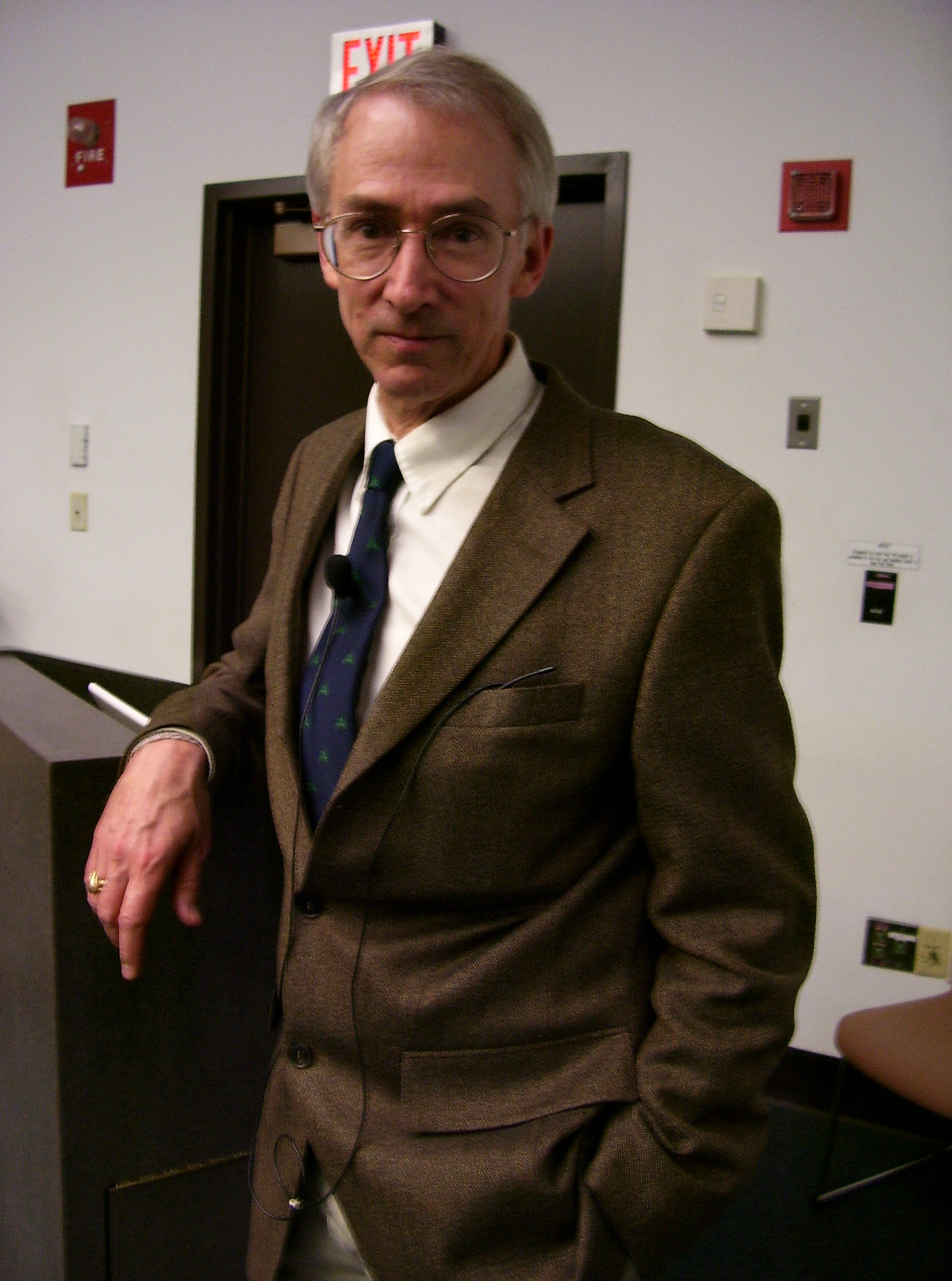
- Wilson in 2006
- Born: 1949 (age 76–77)
- Education: University of Rochester (BA); Michigan State University (PhD)
- Known for: Darwin's Cathedral; Evolution for Everyone
- Partner: Anne Barrett Clark
- Children: Katie Wilson
- Father: Sloan Wilson
- Scientific career
- Fields: Evolutionary biology, anthropology
- Workplaces: Binghamton University; ProSocial World; Evolution Institute
- Doctoral students: Jonathan Gottschall

David Sloan Wilson (born 1949) is an American evolutionary biologist. He is a distinguished professor emeritus of biological sciences and anthropology at Binghamton University. He is a son of author Sloan Wilson, a co-founder of Evolution Institute and a co-founder of Prosocial World. He has studied social evolution in Binghamton.

== Early life and academic career ==
David Sloan Wilson is the son of the writer Sloan Wilson. He graduated with a B.A. with high honors in 1971 from the University of Rochester. He completed his Ph.D. in 1975 at Michigan State University. Wilson then worked as a research fellow in the Biological Laboratories at Harvard University from 1974 to 1975. He held a dual position as research associate in zoology at the University of the Witwatersrand and the University of Washington from 1975 to 1976. After this he was a senior research officer at the South African National Research Institute for the Mathematical Sciences from 1976 to 1977.

Wilson moved back to the United States and held an assistant professorship in the Division of Environmental Studies at the University of California, Davis, from 1977 to 1980. He served as an assistant and then associate professor at the Kellogg Biological Station and Department of Zoology of Michigan State University from 1980 to 1988. Wilson was promoted to full professor of biological sciences at the State University of New York, Binghamton, in 1988. He was given a joint appointment as professor of anthropology in 2001 and retired in 2019.

Wilson started the Evolutionary Studies (EvoS) program at Binghamton University to unify diverse disciplines under the theory of evolution. Students in the program take evolution-themed courses in a variety of disciplines including biology, anthropology, psychology, bioengineering, philosophy, religion and the psychology of religion. There is also a required "Current Topics in Evolutionary Studies" weekly seminar and discussion. Several other universities, including SUNY New Paltz have started a similar program.

== Research ==
Wilson is a prominent proponent of the concept of group selection (also known as multi-level selection) in evolution. He and Elliott Sober proposed a framework called multilevel selection theory, which challenges the more orthodox approach of gene-level selection and individual selection, in their book Unto Others. This framework argues that natural selection operates on a nested hierarchy of units, such as between genes within individuals, between individuals within groups, between groups within a multi-group population, and even between ecosystems (such as microbiomes) in multi-ecosystem populations. Each level of selection results in adaptations at that level and tends to be undermined by selection at lower levels. Hence the notion of multilevel selection.

Wilson has also coined the concept of a trait-group, a group of organisms linked not permanently as a group but having a shared fate due to interactions that they have.

Wilson has described himself as an "enthusiastic proponent" of the extended evolutionary synthesis.

== Personal life ==
Wilson is the father of community organizer Katie Wilson, who is serving as the mayor of Seattle since 2026.

== Publications ==
- Wilson, D. S. (1980). The Natural Selection of Populations and Communities. Menlo Park, CA: Benjamin/Cummings.
- Sober, E., & Wilson, D. S. (1998). Unto Others: The Evolution and Psychology of Unselfish Behavior. Cambridge, MA: Harvard University Press.
- Wilson, D. S. (2002). Darwin's Cathedral: Evolution, Religion and the Nature of Society. Chicago: University of Chicago Press.
- Gottschall, J. & Wilson, D.S., Eds. (2005). The Literary Animal: Evolution and the Nature of Narrative. Northwestern University Press
- Wilson, D.S. (2007) Evolution for Everyone: How Darwin's Theory Can Change the Way We Think About Our Lives. Delacorte Press.
- Wilson, D.S. (2011) The Neighborhood Project: Using Evolution to Improve My City, One Block At A Time. Little, Brown.
- Oakley, B., Knafo, A., Madhavan, G., and Wilson, D.S., Eds. (2011). Pathological Altruism. Oxford University Press.
- Wilson, D.S. (2015) Does Altruism Exist? Culture, Genes, and the Welfare of Others. Yale University and Templeton Press.
- Wilson, D. S., & Kirman, A. (2016). Complexity and Evolution: Toward a New Synthesis for Economics. (David Sloan Wilson & A. Kirman, Eds.). Cambridge Mass.: MIT Press
- Wilson, D. S., & Hayes, S. C. (2018). Evolution and Contextual Behavioral Science: An Integrated Framework for Understanding, Predicting, and Influencing Behavior. Menlo Park, CA: New Harbinger Press.
- Wilson, D.S. (2019) This View of Life: Completing the Darwinian Revolution. Pantheon Press.
- Atkins, P. W. D., Wilson, D. S., & Hayes, S. C. (2019). Prosocial: Using evolutionary science to build productive, equitable, and collaborative groups. New Harbinger
- Wilson, D. S., Geher, G., Gallup, A., & Head, H. (Eds.). (2019). Darwin's Roadmap to the Curriculum: Evolutionary Studies in Higher Education. Oxford University Press, USA: Oxford University Press USA.
- Wilson, D.S. (2020) Atlas Hugged: The Autobiography of John Galt III (novel). VidLit Press.
- Wilson, D.S. (2022) A Life Informed by Evolution (memoir).

Wilson's book Darwin's Cathedral proposes that religions are primarily group-level adaptations that evolve by cultural group selection. His book Evolution for Everyone: How Darwin's Theory Can Change the Way We Think About Our Lives attempts to give an introduction to evolution for a broad audience, detailing the various ways in which evolution can be applied to everyday affairs. Since 2003, he has taught a class at Binghamton University called "Evolution for Everyone".

Wilson's book for a general audience, The Neighborhood Project: Using Evolution to Improve My City, One Block at a Time (2011), describes how he started to apply evolutionary thinking to real-world settings in Binghamton and elsewhere through the Evolution Institute.

Wilson and his co-author E. O. Wilson have become well known for the quote, "Selfishness beats altruism within groups. Altruistic groups beat selfish groups. Everything else is commentary". This quotation appeared in their paper, "Rethinking the Theoretical Foundation of Sociobiology".

Wilson is editor in chief of Prosocial World's online magazine This View of Life, which features articles on all topic areas from an evolutionary perspective.

Wilson's latest nonfiction book for a general audience is This View of Life: Completing the Darwinian Revolution, published in 2019. The evolutionary biologist builds on decades of research to outline a paradigm-changing new approach to the applications of evolutionary theory in today's social and cultural institutions.

Wilson's latest book, Atlas Hugged, is fiction, an answer to Ayn Rand's novel Atlas Shrugged.

Wilson's full list of academic publications may be found on his David Sloan Wilson Archive: all academic publications.
