= Darwin's Cathedral =

2002 book by David Sloan Wilson

Darwin's Cathedral: Evolution, Religion, and the Nature of Society
- Author: David Sloan Wilson
- Language: English
- Genre: Non-fiction
- Publication date: 2002
- ISBN: 978-0-226-90135-0

Darwin's Cathedral: Evolution, Religion, and the Nature of Society (ISBN 9780226901350) is a 2002 book by David Sloan Wilson which proposes that religion is a multi-level adaptation—i.e., a product of cultural evolution developed through multi-level selection.

== Reception ==
The Journal of the American Academy of Religion called it a "welcome book" because "it unsettles everybody, evolutionary biologist and religious believer alike". Jared Diamond in the New York Review of Books called it a "thought-provoking book" which "will stimulate each reader to examine his or her personal view of religion's future".
