= Nina Witoszek =

Polish-Irish-Norwegian writer and research professor

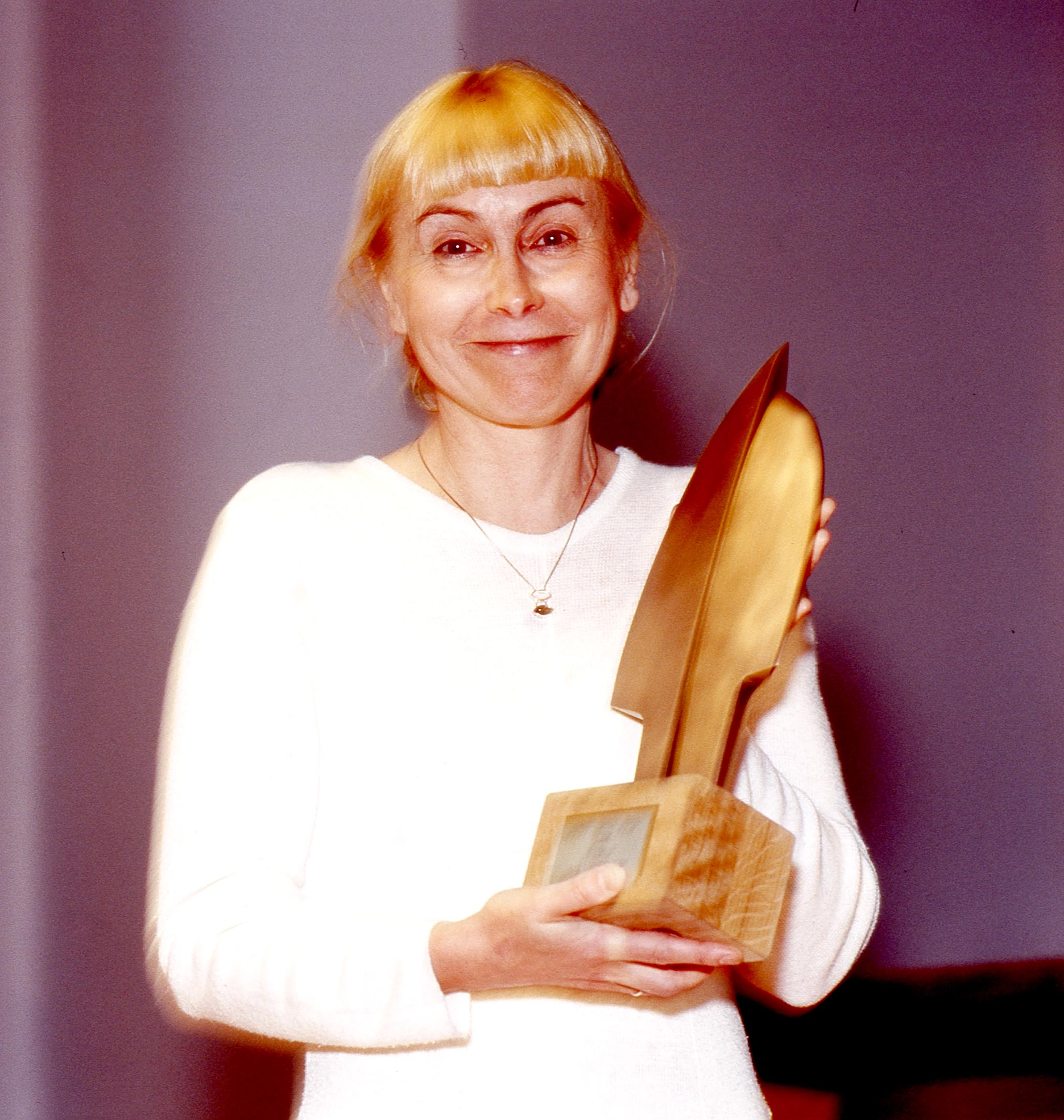
- Nina Witoszek, 2005
- Born: 15 July 1954 (age 72); Poland
- Education: University of Wrocław , Stockholm University
- Employer: Civitas University
- Awards: Fritt Ord Award (2005)
- Website: https://ninawitoszek.org/

Nina Witoszek (born 15 July 1954) is a Polish-born Norwegian cultural historian, writer and public intellectual whose work spans academic scholarship, fiction and public debate.

Since 2024, she has been a visiting professor at Civitas University in Warsaw. She was previously a research professor at the Centre for Development and the Environment at the University of Oslo and director of the Arne Næss Programme on Global Justice and the Environment. She has also held academic positions and fellowships at the European University Institute in Florence and at the universities of Oxford, Cambridge and Galway.

Witoszek's research focuses on Scandinavian cultural history, political traditions, environmentalism, democracy and social change. Her books include Najlepszy kraj na świecie (The Best Country in the World, 2017); Sustainable Modernity: The Nordic Model and Beyond (2018), co-edited with Atle Midttun; The Origins of Anti-Authoritarianism (2020); Det blåøyde riket: Norske tillitspatologier (2023), co-authored with Eva Joly; and Small Groups as the Engines of Cultural Evolution (2026).

She also writes fiction under the name Nina FitzPatrick and has been a regular voice in Norwegian public debate. In 2005, she received the Fritt Ord Prize for her contribution to freedom of expression and for bringing Eastern European perspectives into Scandinavian public debate.

== Academic career and research ==
Witoszek studied at the University of Wrocław in Poland. After leaving Poland, she taught comparative cultural history at the University of Galway and subsequently at the European University Institute in Florence. She has held fellowships at the Swedish Collegium for Advanced Study in Uppsala, Robinson College, Cambridge, and Mansfield College, Oxford, and has been a visiting scholar at Stanford University.

Much of Witoszek's scholarship examines the relationship between cultural narratives, political institutions and social change. Her early work explored Scandinavian cultural history and environmental traditions, including the role of nature in Norwegian national identity in Norwegian Nature Mythologies (1998) and The Origins of the Regime of Goodness (2012). She later extended this approach to the Nordic model, examining the cultural traditions and institutions associated with cooperation, social trust and the development of Scandinavian welfare societies.

Her later research has focused on anti-authoritarian resistance, civic cooperation and the role of small groups in social transformation. The Origins of Anti-Authoritarianism examines individuals and groups involved in Polish anti-authoritarian movements, including the Polish Workers' Defence Committee (KOR) and Solidarność. In Small Groups as the Engines of Cultural Evolution (2026), published in the Cambridge Elements series, Witoszek examines small groups as agents of cultural innovation and institutional change. The study considers both their capacity to foster cooperation and social innovation and their potential contribution to extremism and social fragmentation.

== Fiction and other writing ==
Under the pen name Nina FitzPatrick, Witoszek has published the short-story collection Fables of the Irish Intelligentsia and the novels The Loves of Faustyna, Daimons and Tesla's Curse. Some of her literary work was written in collaboration with her husband, the Irish literary scholar and writer Pat Sheeran.

She has also written scripts and documentary works on figures in Norwegian intellectual and cultural history, including Fridtjof Nansen, Arne Næss and Thor Heyerdahl.

== Public debate ==
Alongside her academic work, Witoszek has participated in Norwegian public debate on democracy, environmental politics, education, European affairs, Poland and Norwegian political culture. She has been a regular contributor to the biggest Norwegian daily Aftenposten. Her writing has frequently compared Eastern European and Nordic political experience, particularly in relation to authoritarianism, civil society, institutional trust and democratic culture.

In 2005, Witoszek received the Fritt Ord Prize, the Fritt Ord Foundation's principal award. The foundation cited her contribution to Norwegian public debate and her role in bringing Eastern European perspectives to discussions of democracy, identity and relations between Eastern and Western Europe. In 2006, the Norwegian newspaper Dagbladet included her in its selection of ten leading intellectuals in Norway.

== Selection of scholarly books ==
- Witoszek, N. (2026) Small Groups as the Engines of Cultural Evolution (Cambridge University Press)
- Witoszek, N. and Larsen, M. Evolutionary Perspectives on Enhancing the Quality of Life (Cambridge University Press, 2024)
- Witoszek, N. and Joly, E. Det blåøyde riket. Norske tillitspatologier. (Oslo: Cappelen Damm, 2023)
- Witoszek, N. (2020) Korzenie anty-autorytaryzmu (Warszawa: Scholar Publishers)
- Witoszek, N. (2019) The Origins of Antiauthoritarianism. (London: Routledge)
- Witoszek, N, and Midttun, A (ed). Sustainable Modernity: The Nordic Model and Beyond. (London: Routledge)
- Trägårdh, L. and N. Witoszek (eds), Civil Society in the Age of Monitory Democracy, (Oxford: Berghahn, 2013)
- Witoszek, N. (2011) The Origins of the Regime of Goodness. Remapping the Norwegian Cultural History. (Oslo: Universitetsforlaget)
- Witoszek, N. (2009) Nina Verdens beste land /The Best country in the world, Oslo: Aschehoug, 2009.
- Witoszek, N. and Trägårdh, L., Culture and Crisis: the Case of Germany and Scandinavia, New York, Oxford: Berghahn Books Inc., 2002.
- Witoszek, N. and Bo Stråth, The Postmodern Challenge: East and West Perspectives, Amsterdam/Atlanta: Rodopi, 1999.
- Witoszek, N. and A. Brennan, Philosophical Dialogues: Arne Næss and the Progress of Deep Ecology, Boston: Rowman and Littlefield 1999.
- Witoszek, N. (1998) Norske naturmytologier (The Norwegian Nature Mythologies) Oslo: Pax.
- Witoszek, N. and P. Sheeran (1992) Talking to the Dead: The Irish Funerary Traditions. Atlanta: Rodopi 1997.

== Selected works of fiction ==
- Tesla's Curse, Oslo: Malina Press, 2021
- Operation Opera, opera libretto. Norwegian Premiere at Den Norske Opera, 2011.
- Daimons, Boston: Justin Charles, 2003.
- The Loves of Faustyna, New York: Penguin Books, 1995
- Fables of the Irish Intelligentsia (1991) New York: Penguin Books 1993. Winner of The Irish Times / Aer Lingus Fiction Award.

Awards
Preceded by Unni Wikan	Recipient of the Fritt Ord Award; 2005	Succeeded by Bjørgulv Braanen
