= Cliodynamics =

Mathematical modeling of historical processes

Cliodynamics (/ˌkliːoʊdaɪˈnæmɪks/) is a transdisciplinary area of research that integrates cultural evolution, economic history/cliometrics, macrosociology, the mathematical modeling of historical processes during the longue durée, and the construction and analysis of historical databases.

Cliodynamics seeks to treat history as science. Its proponents develop theories intended to explain such dynamical processes as the rise and fall of empires, population booms and busts, and the spread and disappearance of religions. These theories are translated into mathematical models, whose predictions are then tested against data; building and analyzing massive databases of historical and archaeological information is therefore one of the central goals of cliodynamics. Critics, however, reject the premise that complex historical societies can be reduced to quantifiable points in phase space, or that historical mechanisms can be organized into a stable, time-invariant explanatory system.

== Etymology ==
The word cliodynamics is composed of clio- and -dynamics. In Greek mythology, Clio is the muse of history. Dynamics, most broadly, is the study of how and why phenomena change with time.

The term was initially coined by Peter Turchin in 2003, and can be traced to the work of such figures as Ibn Khaldun, Alexandre Deulofeu, Jack Goldstone, Sergey Kapitsa, Randall Collins, John Komlos, and Andrey Korotayev.

== Mathematical modeling of historical dynamics ==
Historical processes are dynamic, in that they change with time: populations increase and decline, economies expand and contract, states grow and collapse, and so on. As such, practitioners of cliodynamics apply mathematical models to explain macrohistorical patterns—things like the rise of empires, social discontent, civil wars, and state collapse.

== Research ==
=== Areas of study ===
As of 2016, the main directions of academic study in cliodynamics are:

- The coevolutionary model of social complexity and warfare, based on the theoretical framework of cultural multilevel selection
- The study of revolutions and rebellions
- Structural-demographic theory and secular cycles
- Explanations of the global distribution of languages benefited from the empirical finding that the geographic area in which a language is spoken is more closely associated with the political complexity of the speakers than with all other variables under analysis.
- Mathematical modeling of the long-term ("millennial") trends of world-systems analysis,
- The analysis of vast quantities of historical newspaper content, which shows how periodic structures can be automatically discovered in historical newspapers. A similar analysis of social media again revealed strongly periodic structures.

=== Organizations ===
There are several established venues of peer-reviewed cliodynamics research:

- Cliodynamics: The Journal of Quantitative History and Cultural Evolution is a peer-reviewed web-based (open-access) journal that publishes on the transdisciplinary area of cliodynamics. It seeks to integrate historical models with data to facilitate theoretical progress. The first issue was published in December 2010. Cliodynamics is a member of Scopus and the Directory of Open Access Journals (DOAJ). Since 2024 it is co-edited by Jack Goldstone and Andrey Korotayev .
- The University of Hertfordshire's Cliodynamics Lab is the first lab in the world dedicated explicitly to the new research area of cliodynamics. It is directed by Pieter François, who founded the Lab in 2015.
- The Santa Fe Institute is a private, not-for-profit research and education center where leading scientists grapple with compelling and complex problems. The institute supports research on the complex modeling of networks and dynamical systems. One of the areas of SFI research is cliodynamics. In the past, the institute has sponsored a series of conversations and meetings on theoretical history.

== Criticism ==
Critics of cliodynamics argue that the complex social formations of the past cannot and should not be reduced to quantifiable, analyzable points in phase space, for doing so overlooks each historical society's particular circumstances and dynamics. Many historians and social scientists contend that there are no generalisable causal factors that can explain large numbers of cases, and that historical investigation should focus on the unique trajectories through phase space of each case, highlighting commonalities in outcomes where they exist. As Zhao notes, "most historians believe that the importance of any mechanism in history changes, and more importantly, that there is no time-invariant structure that can organise all historical mechanisms into a system."

== Fiction ==
Starting in the 1940s, Isaac Asimov invented the fictional precursor to this discipline, in what he called psychohistory, as a major plot device in his Foundation series of science fiction novels

== See also ==
- Critical juncture theory
- Generations (book)
- Historical geographic information system
- Sociocultural evolution
- Historical dynamics
- Complex system approach to peace and armed conflict
