= Nikolay Kradin =

Russian anthropologist and archaeologist (born 1962)

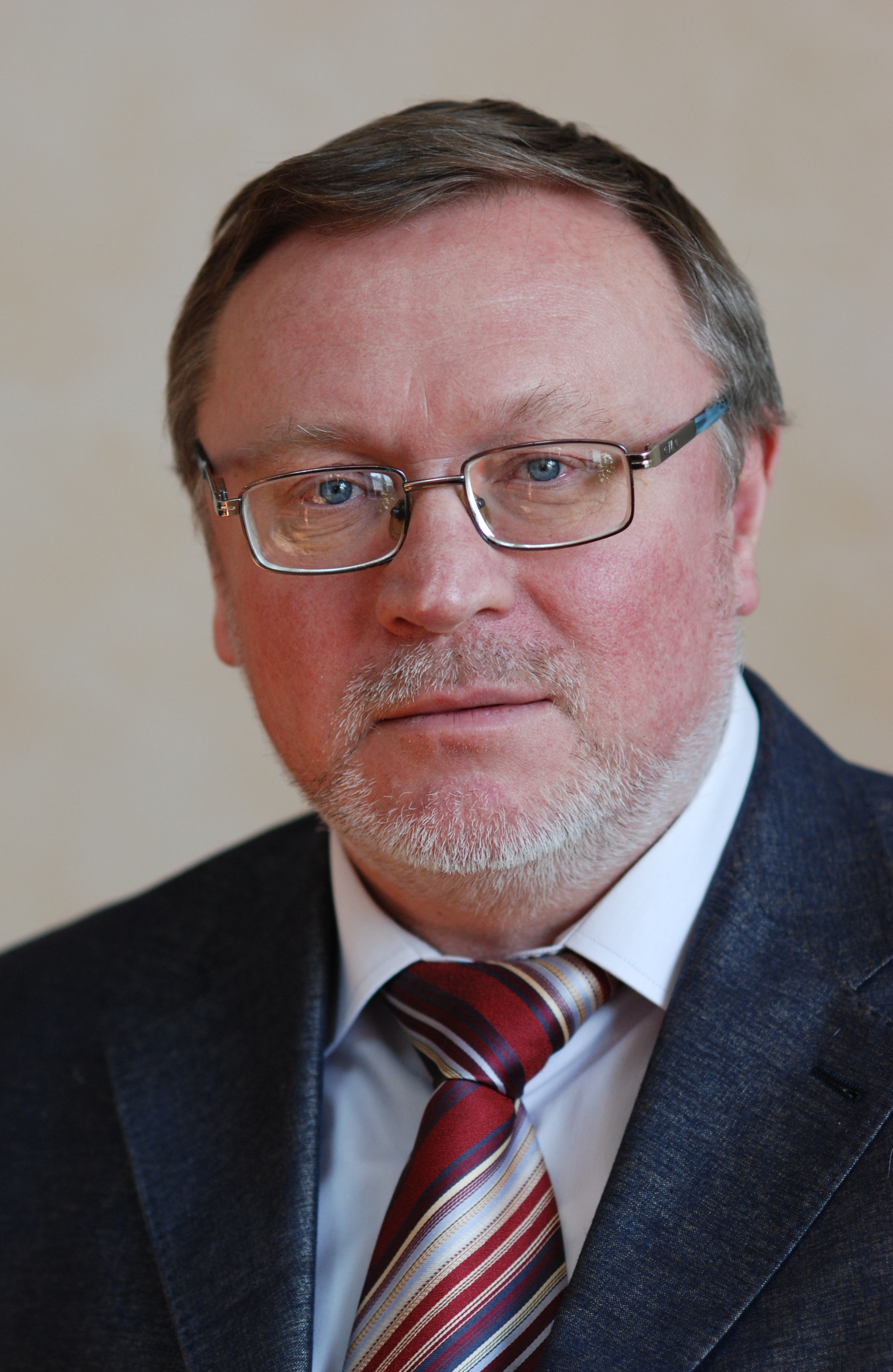
Nikolay Kradin

Nikolay Nikolaevich Kradin (Russian: Крадин Николай Николаевич; born in Onokhoy, Buryatia, Russian SFSR on April 17, 1962) is a Russian anthropologist and archaeologist. Since 1985 he has been a Research Fellow of the Institute of History, Archaeology and Ethnology, Far East Branch of the Russian Academy of Sciences in Vladivostok. He was Head and Professor of the Department of Social Anthropology in the Far-Eastern National Technical University (1999 - 2011), and also Head and Professor of the Department of World History, Archaeology and Anthropology in the Far-Eastern Federal University (2011 - 2016). Corresponding Member of the Russian Academy of Sciences since 2011 and full Member of the Russian Academy of Sciences since 2022.

== Education ==
- B.A., M.A. Irkutsk State University, 1985
- Ph.D., Institute of History, Archaeology and Ethnology, Far East Branch of the Russian Academy of Sciences in Vladivostok, 1990
- Dr.Sc., Institute of Oriental Studies (St.Petersburg Branch), Russian Academy of Sciences, 1999

== Major contributions ==
Nikolay Kradin's major contributions belong to a few fields:

- (1) anthropology and social history of the Eurasian nomads;
- (2) political anthropology and theory of the state formation;
- (3) social archaeology of East and Inner Asia cultures;

Among other things Kradin has demonstrated that an alternative to the state seems to be represented by the supercomplex chiefdoms created by some nomads of Eurasia – the number of the structural levels within such chiefdoms appear to be equal, or even to exceed those within the average state, but they have an entirely different type of political organization and political leadership; such type of political entities do not appear to have been ever created by the agriculturists.

- (4) social archaeology of the nomadic empires.

Kradin has written over 14 books and 500 articles dealing with his research interests. These include Nomadic Societies (1992 in Russian), The Xiongnu Empire (1966, 2001, 2002, 2020 in Russian), Political Anthropology (2001, 2004, 2010, 2011 in Russian), Chinggis Khan Empire (in co-authorship with T.Skrynnikova, 2006, 2022 in Russian), Nomads of Eurasia (2007 in Russian), Nomads of Inner Asia in Transition (2014), History of Khitans Empire Liao (in co-authorship with A.L. Ivliev, 2014 in Russian), The Great Wall of Khitan: North Eastern Wall of Chinggis Khani (in co-authorship, 2019), Nomads and World History (2020 in Russian), Origins of the Inequality, Civilization, and the State (2021 in Russian).

== Selected recent publications in English ==
- Alternatives of Social Evolution: An Introduction. Alternatives of Social Evolution. Ed. by N.Kradin, A.Korotayev, Dmitri Bondarenko, V.de Munck, V.Lynsha et al. Vladivostok: Dal'nauka, 2000. P. 27–89.
- Kradin, Nikolay N. 2000. Nomadic Empires in Evolutionary Perspective. In Alternatives of Social Evolution. Ed. by N.N. Kradin, A.V. Korotayev, Dmitri Bondarenko, V. de Munck, and P.K. Wason (p. 274-288). Vladivostok: Far Eastern Branch of the Russian Academy of Sciences; reprinted in: The Early State, its Alternatives and Analogues. Ed. by Leonid Grinin et al. (р. 501–524). Volgograd: Uchitel', 2004.
- Kradin, Nikolay N. 2002. Nomadism, Evolution, and World-Systems: Pastoral Societies in Theories of Historical Development. Journal of World-System Research 8: 368-388.
- Kradin, Nikolay N. 2003. Nomadic Empires: Origins, Rise, Decline. In Nomadic Pathways in Social Evolution. Ed. by N.N. Kradin, Dmitri Bondarenko, and T. Barfield (p. 73-87). Moscow: Center for Civilizational Studies, Russian Academy of Sciences.
- Kradin, Nikolay N. 2006. Archaeological Criteria of Civilization. Social Evolution & History 5: 89–108.
- Kradin, Nikolay N. 2006. Cultural Complexity of Pastoral Nomads. World Cultures 15: 171-189.
- Kradin, Nikolay N., Skrynnikova Tatiana D. 2006. Why do we call Chinggis Khan's Polity 'an Empire'. Ab Imperio 2006 (1): 89–118.
- Kradin, Nikolay N. 2008. Structure of Power in Nomadic Empires of Inner Asia: Anthropological Approach. In: Hierarchy and Power in the History of Civilizations: Ancient and Medieval Cultures. Ed. By L.E.Grinin, D.D.Beliaev, and A.V.Korotayev. Moscow: URSS, 2008, p. 98-124.
- Kradin, Nikolay N. 2008. Early State Theory and the Evolution of Pastoral Nomads. Social Evolution & History 7 (1): 107–130.
- Kradin, Nikolay N. 2008. Transformation of Peasant Pastoralism among the Aginsky Buryats, end of XX – Beginning of XXI Centuries. In: Proceedings of the International Conference "Dialog between Cultures and Civilizations: Present State and Perspectives of Nomadism in a Globalizing World. Ed. by J. Janzen and B. Enkhtuvshin. Ulaanbaatar, 2008: 153-158.
- Kradin, Nikolay N. 2009. State Origins in Anthropological Thought. Social Evolution & History 8 (1): 25-51.
- Kradin, Nikolay N., Skrynnikova Tatiana D. 2009. "Stateless Head": Notes on Revisionism in the Studies of Nomadic Societies. Ab Imperio 2009 (4): 117–128.
- Kradin, Nikolay N. 2010. Between Khans and Presidents. Anthropology of Politics in Post-Soviet Central Asia. Social Evolution & History 9 (1): 150–172.
- Kradin, Nikolay N. 2011. A Panorama of Social Archaeology in Russia. In: Comparative Archaeologies: A Sociological View of the Science of the Past. Ed. by L.R. Lozny. New York: Springer, 2011: 243–271.
- Kradin, Nikolay N. 2011. Post-Soviet Power in Anthropological Perspective. In: State, Society, and Transformation. Ed. by B. A. Mitchneck. Washington, D.C.: Woodrow Wilson International Center for Scholars, 2011: 50–76.
- Kradin, Nikolay N. 2011. Stateless Empire: The Structure of the Xiongnu Nomadic Super-Complex Chiefdom. In: Xiongnu Archaeology: Multidisciplinary Perspectives of the First Steppe Empire in Inner Asia. Ed. by U. Brosseder and B. Miller. Bonn: Rheinische Friedrich-Wilhelms-Universitat Bonn, 2011: 77-96 (Bonn Contributions to Asian Archaeology, Vol. 5).
- Kradin, Nikolay N. 2013. Chinggis Khan, World System Analysis and Preindustrial Globalization. Entelequia. Revista Interdisciplinar, No 15: 169–188.
- Kradin, Nikolay N. 2013. Criteria of Complexity in Evolution: Cross-Cultural Study in Archaeology of Prehistory. Social Evolution & History12 (1): 28–50.
- Kradin, Nikolay N. 2014. Nomadic Empires in Inner Asia. In: Complexity of Interaction Along the Eurasian Steppe Zone in the First Millennium CE. Ed. by J.Bemmann, and M.Schmauder. Bonn: Rheinische Friedrich-Wilhelms-Universitat Bonn, 2015: 11-48 (Bonn Contributions to Asian Archaeology, Vol. 5).
- Kradin, Nikolay N. 2014. Nomads of Inner Asia in Transition. Moscow: URSS. ISBN 978-5-396-00632-4.
- Kradin, Nikolay N. 2015.The Ecology of Inner Asian Pastoral Nomadism. In: The Ecology of Pastoralism. Ed. By N. Kardulias. Boulder: University Press of Colorado: 41–70.
- Kradin, Nikolay N. 2015. Mongols Empire and Debates of the Nomadic State Origins. In: ‘My Life is like the Summer Rose’, Maurizio Tosi e l’Archeologia come modo di vivere/ Papers in honour of Maurizio Tosi for his 70th birthday. Ed. by C.C. Lamberg-Karlofsky, B. Genito and B. Cerasetti. Oxford: Archaeopress (BAR International Series S2690): 369–375.
- Kradin, Nikolay N. 2016. Archaeology of Deportation: Eurasian Steppe Example. In: Central Eurasia in the Middle Ages. Studies in Honour of Peter B. Golden. Ed. by I.Zimonyi and O.Karatay. Wiesbaden: Harrassowitz Verlag: 209–219.
- Kradin, Nikolay N. 2017. Heterarchy and Hierarchy Among the Ancient Mongolian Nomads (revised version). In: Chiefdoms: Yesterday and Today. Ed. by R.L.Carneiro, L.E.Grinin, and A.V.Korotayev. New York: Eliot Werner Publications Inc.: 155–176.
- Guzev, Mikhail, Kradin, Nikolay N., Nikitina, Evgeniia. 2017. The Imperial Curve of Large Polities. Social Evolution & History 16 (2): 110–123.
- Kradin, Nikolay N. 2018. Nomads and the Theory of Civilizations. In: Anthropology and Civilizational Analysis. Eurasian Explorations. Ed. by Johann P. Arnason and Chris Hann. Albany: State University of New York Press: 303–322.
- Turchin, Petr, et al. [Kradin, Nikolay N.] 2018. Quantitative Historical Analyses Uncover a Single Dimension of Complexity that Structures Global Variation in Human Social Organization. Proceedings of the National Academy of Sciences 115 (2): 144–151.
- de Barros Damgaard, Peter et al. [Kradin, Nikolay N.]. 2018. 137 ancient human genomes from across the Eurasian steppes. Nature 557: 369–374.
- Kradin, Nikolay N., Kradin, Nikolay P. 2019. Heritage of Mongols: The Story of a Russian Orthodox Church in Transbaikalia. International Journal of Historical Archaeology 23 (2): 430-433.
- Kradin, Nikolay N. 2019. Social Complexity, Inner Asia, and Pastoral Nomadism. Social Evolution & History 18 (2): 3-34.
- Choongwon Jeong et al [Kradin, Nikolay]. A Dynamic 6,000-Year Genetic History of Eurasia’s Eastern Steppe. Cell, 2020, Vol. 183, p. 1-15.
- Kradin, Nikolay N. 2020. Origins of the State and Urbanization: Regional Perspectives. In: The Evolution of Social Institution: Interdisciplinary Perspectives. Ed. by D.M. Bondarenko, S.A. Kowalewski, D.B.Small. New York etc.: Springer: 101-129.
- Kradin, Nikolay N. 2020. The Mongol Empire and the Unification of Eurasia. In: The Oxford World History of Empire. Volume Two: The History of Empires. Edited by P.F. Bang, C. A. Bayly, and W. Scheidel. Oxford: Oxford University Press: 507-532.
- Turchin. Petr et al [Kradin, Nikolay]. 2021. Rise of the war machines: Charting the evolution of military technologies from the Neolithic to the Industrial Revolution. PLoS ONE 16 (10, e0258161): 1-23.
