= Homoarchy =

Homoarchy is "the relation of elements to one another when they are rigidly ranked one way only, and thus possess no (or not more than very limited) potential for being unranked or ranked in another or a number of different ways at least without cardinal reshaping of the whole socio-political order."

== Homoarchy and heterarchy ==
This notion is coupled with the one of heterarchy, defined by Crumley as "the relation of elements to one another when they are unranked or when they possess the potential for being ranked in a number of different ways". Note that heterarchy is not the opposite of any hierarchy all together, but is rather the opposite of "homoarchy".

== Homoarchy and hierarchy ==
Homoarchy must not be identified with hierarchy (as well as heterarchy must not be confused with egalitarianism in the proper meaning of the word). In any society both “vertical” and “horizontal” social links may be observed. More so: sometimes it seems too difficult to designate a society as “homoarchic” or “heterarchic” even at the most general level of analysis, like in the cases of the late-ancient Germans and early-medieval “Barbarian kingdoms” in which one can observe the monarchy and quite rigid social hierarchy combined with (at least at the beginning) democratic institutions and procedures (like selection of the king), not less significant for the whole socio-political system's operation. So, it does look like it is impossible to measure degrees of homoarchy and heterarchy in a society with mathematical exactness, for example, in per cent. A purely quantitative approach is also inapplicable here: the presence of, say five hierarchies in a society as an entity does not make it more heterarchic and less homoarchic in comparison with a society with four hierarchies if in the former there is and in the latter there is no one dominant hierarchy. The pathway to evaluation of a society as heterarchic or homoarchic (in either absolute or relative categories) goes through an analysis of it as a whole – as a dynamic system of social hierarchies, and the aim of this analysis in the vein of systems theory should be not to count the hierarchies but to understand the way they are related to each other. Hence, the question which rises at studying a particular society is as follows: are the hierarchies that form the given social system ranked (more or less) rigidly or not? Do, say, two individuals find themselves ranked toward each other the same way in any social context or not?

== See also ==
- Tree structure

== Bibliography ==
- Bondarenko D.M., Grinin L.E., Korotayev A.V. 2002. Alternative Pathways of Social Evolution. Social Evolution & History. Vol. 1, N 1. P. 54-79;
- Bondarenko D.M. 2005. A Homoarchic Alternative to the Homoarchic State: Benin Kingdom of the 13th – 19th Centuries. Social Evolution & History. Vol. 4, N 2. P. 18-88;
- Bondarenko D.M. 2006. Homoarchy: A Principle of Culture’s Organization. The 13th – 19th Centuries Benin Kingdom as a Non-State Supercomplex Society. Moscow: KomKniga/Editorial URSS;
- Bondarenko D.M. 2007. Homoarchy as a Principle of Sociopolitical Organization: An Introduction. . Vol. 102. P. 187–199;
- Bondarenko D.M. 2007. What Is There in a Word? Heterarchy, Homoarchy and the Difference in Understanding Complexity in the Social Sciences and Complexity Studies. In K.A. Richardson and P. Cilliers (eds.). Explorations in Complexity Thinking: Pre-Proceedings of the 3rd International Workshop on Complexity and Philosophy. Mansfield, MA: ISCE Publishing. P. 35–48;
- Bondarenko D.M. and A.A. Nemirovskiy (eds.). 2007. Alternativity in Cultural History: Heterarchy and Homoarchy as Evolutionary Trajectories. Third International Conference “Hierarchy and Power in the History of Civilizations”. June 18–21, 2004, Moscow. Selected Papers. Moscow: Center for Civilizational and Regional Studies Press.
- Cook G.W. 2006. Heterarchy and homoarchy in Maya village politics. Hierarchy and Power in the History of Civilizations, Third International Conference, 2004, Selected Papers. Moscow: RASHN. pp. 69–80.
