= Chiefdom =

Form of hierarchical political organization in non-industrial societies

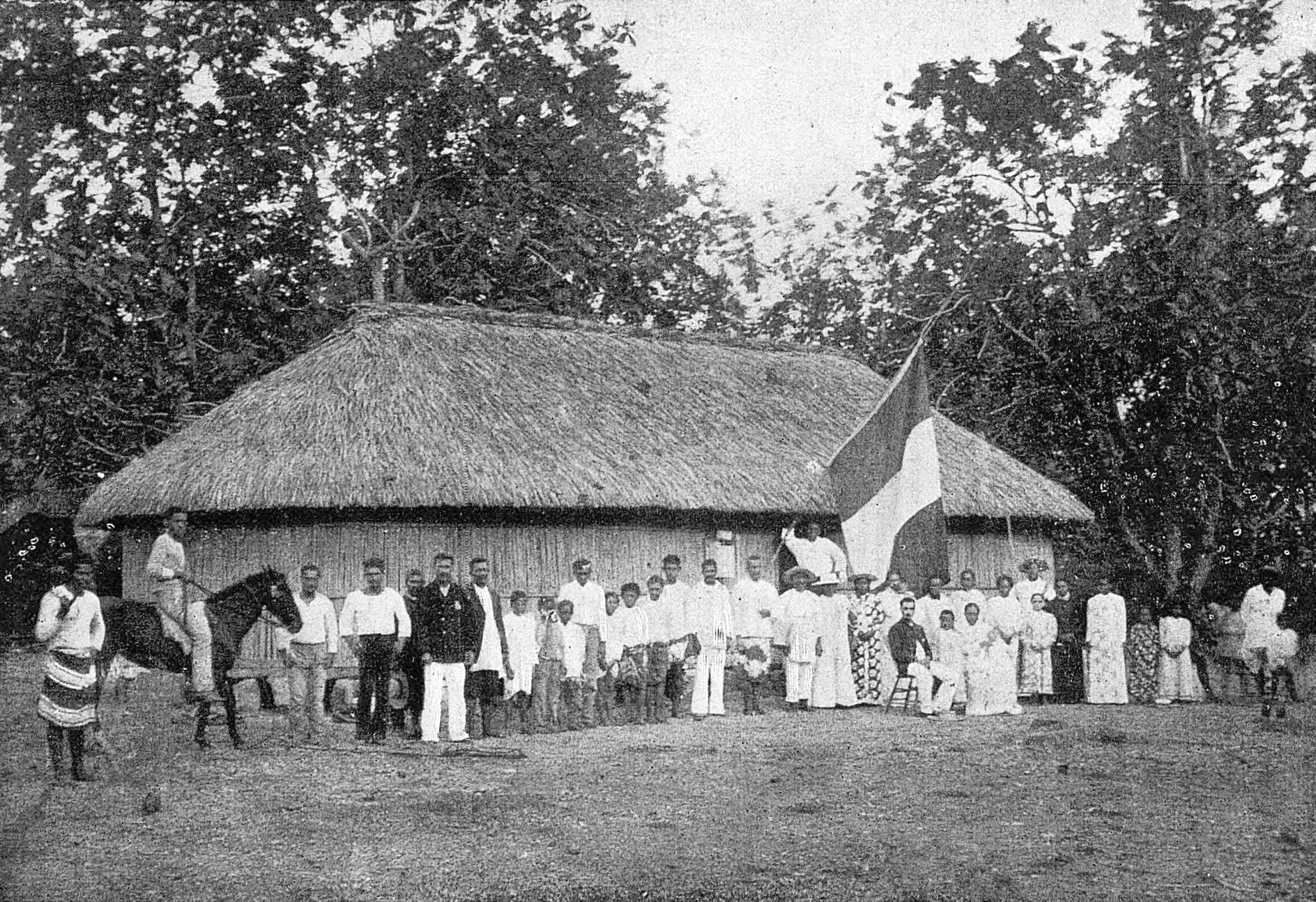
The chiefdom of Afareïtu in Moʻorea, French Polynesia, c. 1890

A chiefdom is a political organization of people represented or governed by a chief. Chiefdoms have been discussed, depending on their scope, as a stateless, state analogue or early state system or institution.

Usually a chief's position is based on kinship, which is often monopolized by the legitimate senior members of select families or 'houses'. These elites can form a political-ideological aristocracy relative to the general group.

Chiefdoms and chiefs are sometimes identified as the same as kingdoms and kings, and therefore understood as monarchies, particularly when they are understood as not necessarily states, but having monarchic representation or government.

== Concept ==
In anthropological theory, one model of human social development rooted in ideas of cultural evolution describes a chiefdom as a form of social organization more complex than a tribe or a band society, and less complex than a state or a civilization.

Within general theories of cultural evolution, chiefdoms are characterized by permanent and institutionalized forms of political leadership (the chief), centralized decision-making, economic interdependence, and social hierarchy.

Chiefdoms are described as intermediate between tribes and states in the progressive scheme of sociopolitical development formulated by Elman Service: band - tribe - chiefdom - state. A chief's status is based on kinship, so it is inherited or ascribed, in contrast to the achieved status of Big Man leaders of tribes. Another feature of chiefdoms is therefore pervasive social inequality. They are ranked societies, according to the scheme of progressive sociopolitical development formulated by Morton Fried: egalitarian - ranked - stratified - state.

The most succinct definition of a chiefdom in anthropology is by Robert L. Carneiro: "An autonomous political unit comprising a number of villages or communities under the permanent control of a paramount chief" (Carneiro 1981: 45).

=== Chiefdoms in archaeological theory ===
In archaeological theory, Service's definition of chiefdoms as “redistribution societies with a permanent central agency of coordination” (Service 1962: 134) has been most influential. Many archaeologists, however, dispute Service's reliance upon redistribution as central to chiefdom societies, and point to differences in the basis of finance (staple finance v. wealth finance). Service argued that chief rose to assume a managerial status to redistribute agricultural surplus to ecologically specialized communities within this territory (staple finance). Yet in re-studying the Hawaiian chiefdoms used as his case study, Timothy Earle observed that communities were rather self-sufficient. What the chief redistributed was not staple goods, but prestige goods to his followers that helped him to maintain his authority (wealth finance).

Some scholars contest the utility of the chiefdom model for archaeological inquiry. The most forceful critique comes from Timothy Pauketat, whose Chiefdom and Other Archaeological Delusions outlines how chiefdoms fail to account for the high variability of the archaeological evidence for middle-range societies. Pauketat argues that the evolutionary underpinnings of the chiefdom model are weighed down by racist and outdated theoretical baggage that can be traced back to Lewis Morgan's 19th-century cultural evolution. From this perspective, pre-state societies are treated as underdeveloped, the savage and barbaric phases that preceded civilization. Pauketat argues that the chiefdom type is a limiting category that should be abandoned, and takes as his main case study Cahokia, a central place for the Mississippian culture of North America.

Pauketat's provocation, however, has been accused of not offering a sound alternative to the chiefdom type. For while he claims that chiefdoms are a delusion, he describes Cahokia as a civilization. This has been debated to uphold rather than challenge the evolutionary scheme he contests.

=== Simple category ===
Chiefdoms are characterized by the centralization of authority and pervasive inequality. At least two inherited social classes (elite and commoner) are present. (The ancient Hawaiian chiefdoms had as many as four social classes.) An individual might change social class during a lifetime by extraordinary behavior. A single lineage/family of the elite class becomes the ruling elite of the chiefdom, with the greatest influence, power, and prestige. Kinship is typically an organizing principle, while marriage, age, and sex can affect one's social status and role.

A single simple chiefdom is generally composed of a central community surrounded by or near a number of smaller subsidiary communities. All of the communities recognize the authority of a single kin group or individual with hereditary centralized power, dwelling in the primary community. Each community will have its own leaders, which are usually in a tributary and/or subservient relationship to the ruling elite of the primary community.

=== Complex category ===
A complex chiefdom is a group of simple chiefdoms controlled by a single paramount center and ruled by a paramount chief. Complex chiefdoms have two or even three tiers of political hierarchy. Nobles are clearly distinct from commoners and do not usually engage in any form of agricultural production. The higher members of society consume most of the goods that are passed up the hierarchy as a tribute.

Reciprocal obligations are fulfilled by the nobles carrying out rituals that only they can perform. They may also make token, symbolic redistributions of food and other goods. In two- or three-tiered chiefdoms, higher-ranking chiefs have control over a number of lesser ranking individuals, each of whom controls specific territory or social units. Political control rests on the chief's ability to maintain access to a sufficiently large body of tribute, passed up the line by lesser chiefs. These lesser chiefs in turn collect from those below them, from communities close to their own center. At the apex of the status hierarchy sits the paramount.

Anthropologists and archaeologists have demonstrated through research that chiefdoms are a relatively unstable form of social organization. They are prone to cycles of collapse and renewal, in which tribal units band together, expand in power, fragment through some form of social stress, and band together again. An example of this kind of social organization were the Germanic Peoples who conquered the western Roman Empire in the 5th century CE. Although commonly referred to as tribes, anthropologists classified their society as chiefdoms. They had a complex social hierarchy consisting of kings, a warrior aristocracy, common freemen, serfs, and slaves.

The Native American tribes sometimes had ruling kings or satraps (governors) in some areas and regions. The Cherokee, for example, had an imperial-family ruling system over a long period of history. The early Spanish explorers in the Americas reported on the Indian kings and kept extensive notes during what is now called the conquest. Some of the native tribes in the Americas had princes, nobles, and various classes and castes. The "Great Sun" was somewhat like the Great Khans of Asia and eastern Europe. Much like an emperor, the Great Sun of North America is the best example of chiefdoms and imperial kings in North American Indian history. The Aztecs of Mexico had a similar culture.

== Chiefdoms on the Indian subcontinent ==
The Indus Valley Civilisation (3300 BCE - 1700 BCE) was a hegemony of chiefdoms with supreme chiefs in each and a system of subsidiary chiefs. The ranks of the chiefs included ordinary chiefs, elders, priests or cattle-owners and head chiefs.

The Arthashastra, a work on politics written some time between the 4th century BC and 2nd century AD by Indian author Chanakya, similarly describes the Rajamandala (or "Raja-mandala,") as circles of friendly and enemy states surrounding the state of a king (raja). Also see Suhas Chatterjee, Mizo Chiefs and the Chiefdom (1995).

== African chiefdoms ==
Most African traditional societies involved chiefdoms in their political and social structure before European colonisation. For an example see the political organisation of the Mandinka people in West Africa. Each clan, tribe, kingdom, and empire had its traditional leader, king, or queen. Ewe people call the king or chief Togbui Ga, the Fon people Dah, the Kotafon people Ga, and Ashanti people Asantehene. Traditional authority is a distinguishing feature in the landscape of contemporary Africa. It remains important in organising the life of people at the local level despite modern state structures.

== Native chieftain system in China ==
Tusi (Chinese: 土司), also known as Headmen or Chieftains, were tribal leaders recognized as imperial officials by the Yuan, Ming, and Qing-era Chinese governments, principally in Yunnan. The arrangement is generally known as the Native Chieftain System (Chinese: 土司制度; pinyin: Tǔsī Zhìdù).

== Alternatives to chiefdoms ==
In prehistoric South-West Asia, alternatives to chiefdoms were the non-hierarchical systems of complex acephalous communities, with a pronounced autonomy of single-family households. These communities have been analyzed recently by Berezkin, who suggests the Apa Tanis as their ethnographic parallel (Berezkin 1995). Frantsouzoff (2000) finds a more developed example of such type of polities in ancient South Arabia in the Wadi Hadhramawt of the 1st millennium BCE.

In Southeast Asian history up to the early 19th century, the metaphysical view of the cosmos called the mandala (i.e., circle) is used to describe a Southeast Asian political model, which in turn describes the diffuse patterns of political power distributed among Mueang (principalities) where circles of influence were more important than central power. The concept counteracts modern tendencies to look for unified political power like that of the large European kingdoms and nation states, which one scholar posited were an inadvertent byproduct of 15th-century advances in map-making technologies.

Nikolay Kradin has demonstrated that an alternative to the state seems to be represented by the supercomplex chiefdoms created by some nomads of Eurasia. The number of structural levels within such chiefdoms appears to be equal, or even to exceed those within the average state, but they have a different type of political organization and political leadership. Such types of political entities do not appear to have been created by the agriculturists (e.g., Kradin 2000, 2002, 2003, 2004).

== See also ==
- Cacicazgo
- Chief of the Name
- Band society
- Mandala (Southeast Asian political model)
- Tanistry
- Tribe

== Bibliography ==
- Berezkin, Yu. E. 1995. "Alternative Models of Middle Range Society" and " 'Individualistic' Asia vs. 'Collectivistic' America?", in Alternative Pathways to Early State, Ed. N. N. Kradin & V. A. Lynsha. Vladivostok: Dal'nauka: 75–83.
- Carneiro, R. L. 1981. "The Chiefdom: Precursor of the State", The Transition to Statehood in the New World / Ed. by G. D. Jones and R. R. Kautz, pp. 37–79. Cambridge, UK – New York, NY: Cambridge University Press.
- Carneiro, R. L. 1991. "The Nature of the Chiefdom as Revealed by Evidence from the Cauca Valley of Colombia", Profiles in Cultural Evolution / Ed. by A.T. Rambo and K. Gillogly, pp. 167–90. Ann Arbor, MI: University of Michigan Press.
- Carneiro, R. L. 1998 "What Happened at Flashpoint? Conjectures on Chiefdom Formation at the Very Moment of Conception." In: Chiefdoms and Chieftaincy in the Americas. University Press of Florida, Gainesville, p. 19-42.
- Earle, T. K. 1997. How Chiefs Came to Power: The Political Economy of Prehistory. Stanford, CA: Stanford University Press.
- Frantsouzoff S. A. 2000. "The Society of Raybūn", in Alternatives of Social Evolution. Ed. by N.N. Kradin, A.V. Korotayev, Dmitri Bondarenko, V. de Munck, and P.K. Wason (p. 258-265). Vladivostok: Far Eastern Branch of the Russian Academy of Sciences.
- Korotayev, Andrey V. 2000. Chiefdom: Precursor of the Tribe?, in Alternatives of Social Evolution. Ed. by N.N. Kradin, A.V. Korotayev, Dmitri Bondarenko, V. de Munck, and P.K. Wason (p. 242-257). Vladivostok: Far Eastern Branch of the Russian Academy of Sciences; reprinted in: The Early State, its Alternatives and Analogues. Ed. by Leonid Grinin et al. (р. 300–324). Volgograd: Uchitel', 2004.
- Kradin, Nikolay N. 2000. "Nomadic Empires in Evolutionary Perspective", in Alternatives of Social Evolution. Ed. by N.N. Kradin, A.V. Korotayev, Dmitri Bondarenko, V. de Munck, and P.K. Wason (p. 274-288). Vladivostok: Far Eastern Branch of the Russian Academy of Sciences; reprinted in: The Early State, its Alternatives and Analogues. Ed. by Leonid Grinin et al. (р. 501–524). Volgograd: Uchitel', 2004.
- Kradin, Nikolay N. 2002. "Nomadism, Evolution, and World-Systems: Pastoral Societies in Theories of Historical Development", Journal of World-System Research 8: 368–388.
- Kradin, Nikolay N. 2003. "Nomadic Empires: Origins, Rise, Decline", Nomadic Pathways in Social Evolution. Ed. by N.N. Kradin, Dmitri Bondarenko, and T. Barfield (p. 73-87). Moscow: Center for Civilizational Studies, Russian Academy of Sciences.
