= Uchitel =

Uchitel (Russian or Ukrainian: учитель) means teacher in Russian and Ukrainian languages and may refer to:

- Uchitel Publishing House, Russian publishers
- Alexei Uchitel (born 1951), Russian film director
- Rachel Uchitel (born 1975), American nightclub hostess
