= Heterarchy =

System of organization where the elements of the organization are unranked

A heterarchy is a system of organization where the elements of the organization are unranked (non-hierarchical) or where they possess the potential to be ranked a number of different ways. Definitions of the term vary among the disciplines: in social and information sciences, heterarchies are networks of elements in which each element shares the same "horizontal" position of power and authority, each playing a theoretically equal role. In biological taxonomy, however, the requisite features of heterarchy involve, for example, a species sharing, with a species in a different family, a common ancestor which it does not share with members of its own family. This is theoretically possible under principles of "horizontal gene transfer".

A heterarchy may be orthogonal to a hierarchy, subsumed to a hierarchy, or it may contain hierarchies; the two kinds of structure are not mutually exclusive. In fact, each level in a hierarchical system is composed of a potentially heterarchical group.

The concept of heterarchy was first employed in a modern context by cybernetician Warren McCulloch in 1945. As Carole L. Crumley has summarised, "[h]e examined alternative cognitive structure(s), the collective organization of which he termed heterarchy. He demonstrated that the human brain, while reasonably orderly was not organized hierarchically. This understanding revolutionized the neural study of the brain and solved major problems in the fields of artificial intelligence and computer design."

== General principles, operationalization, and evidence ==
In a group of related items, heterarchy is a state wherein any pair of items is likely to be related in two or more differing ways. Whereas hierarchies sort groups into progressively smaller categories and subcategories, heterarchies divide and unite groups variously, according to multiple concerns that emerge or recede from view according to perspective. Crucially, no one way of dividing a heterarchical system can ever be a totalizing or all-encompassing view of the system, each division is clearly partial, and in many cases, a partial division leads us, as perceivers, to a feeling of contradiction that invites a new way of dividing things. (But of course the next view is just as partial and temporary.) Heterarchy is a name for this state of affairs, and a description of a heterarchy usually requires ambivalent thought, a willingness to ambulate freely between unrelated perspectives.

However, because the requirements for a heterarchical system are not exactly stated, identifying a heterarchy through the use of archaeological materials can often prove to be difficult.

In an attempt to operationalize heterarchies, Schoenherr and Dopko use the concept of reward systems and relational models theory. Relational models are defined by distinct expectations for exchanges between individuals in terms of authority ranking, equality matching, communality, and market pricing. They suggest that discrepancies in the kind of reward that is used to assign merit and differences in merit assigned to specific groups of individuals can be used as evidence for heterarchical structure. Their study demonstrates differences in the number of women assigned PhDs, the number of women receiving academic appointments in high status academic institutions, and scientific awards.

Examples of heterarchical conceptualizations include the Gilles Deleuze/Félix Guattari conceptions of deterritorialization, rhizome, and body without organs.

== Information studies ==
Numerous observers in the information sciences have argued that heterarchical structure processes more information more effectively than hierarchical design. An example of the potential effectiveness of heterarchy would be the rapid growth of the heterarchical Wikipedia project in comparison with the failed growth of the Nupedia project. Heterarchy increasingly trumps hierarchy as complexity and rate of change increase.

Informational heterarchy can be defined as an organizational form somewhere between hierarchy and network that provides horizontal links that permit different elements of an organization to cooperate whilst individually optimizing different success criteria. In an organizational context the value of heterarchy derives from the way in which it permits the legitimate valuation of multiple skills, types of knowledge or working styles without privileging one over the other. In information science, therefore, heterarchy, responsible autonomy and hierarchy are sometimes combined under the umbrella term triarchy.

This concept has also been applied to the field of archaeology, where it has enabled researchers to better understand social complexity. For further reading see the works of Carole Crumley.

The term heterarchy is used in conjunction with the concepts of holons and holarchy to describe individual systems at each level of a holarchy.

== Brain science ==
A heterarchical network could be used to describe neuron connections or democracy, although there are clearly hierarchical elements in both.

== Sociology and political theory ==
Anthropologist Dmitri Bondarenko follows Carole Crumley in her definition of heterarchy as "the relation of elements to one another when they are unranked or when they possess the potential for being ranked in a number of different ways" and argues that it is therefore not strictly the opposite of hierarchy, but is rather the opposite of homoarchy, itself definable as "the relation of elements to one another when they possess the potential for being ranked in one way only".

David C. Stark (1950- ) has been contributing to developing the concept of heterarchy in the sociology of organizations.

Political hierarchies and heterarchies are systems in which multiple dynamic power-structures govern the actions of the system. They represent different types of network structures that allow differing degrees of connectivity. In a (tree-structured) hierarchy every node is connected to at most one parent node and to zero or more child nodes. In a heterarchy, however, a node can be connected to any of its surrounding nodes without needing to go through or to get permission from some other node.

Socially, a heterarchy distributes privilege and decision-making among participants, while a hierarchy assigns more power and privilege to the members "high" in the structure. In a systemic perspective, Gilbert Probst, Jean-Yves Mercier and others describe heterarchy as the flexibility of the formal relationships inside an organization. Domination and subordination links can be reversed and privileges can be redistributed in each situation, following the needs of the system.

Researchers have also framed higher-education staff as operating in a heterarchical structure. Examining sex-based discrimination in psychology, Schoenherr and Dopko identify discrepancies between the number of women awarded PhDs, the number of professorships held by women, and the number of scientific awards granted to women in the behavioral sciences and by the American Psychological Association. They argue that this data supports difference reward systems, representing heterarchies. They go on to connect the notion of heterarchy to contemporary models of relational structures in psychology (i.e., relational models theory). Schoenherr has argued that this is also reflected in divisions within professional psychology, such as those between clinical psychologists and experimental psychologists. Using the history of professional psychology in Canada and the United States, he provides quotations from professional organization to illustrate the disparate identities and reward-systems. Rather than just reflecting a feature of psychological science, these case studies were presented as evidence of heterarchies in academia and in social organizations more generally.

== See also ==
- Adhocracy
- Directed set
- Distributed republic
- Folksonomy
- Gödel Escher Bach – discussed in chapter five
- Hierarchy
- Hierarchical organization
- Homoarchy
- Panarchy
