= URSS =

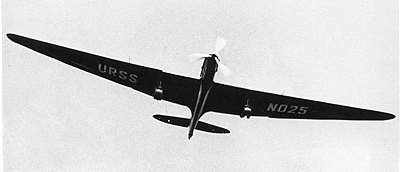
The "URSS"'s (USSR's) Tupolev ANT-25 N025 in flight

URSS is an alternative spelling of USSR. In other languages, it stands for Unión de Repúblicas Socialistas Soviéticas (Spanish), Union des républiques socialistes soviétiques (French), Unyon ng mga Republikang Sosyalistang Sobyet (Filipino), Uni Republik Sosialis Soviet (Indonesian), Unione delle Repubbliche Socialiste Sovietiche (Italian), União das Repúblicas Socialistas Soviéticas (Portuguese), Uniunea Republicilor Sovietice Socialiste (Romanian), Unió de Repúbliques Socialistes Soviètiques (Catalan), among others. Within the Soviet Union itself, URSS was the preferred Latin-script abbreviation for the country until World War II, when it was replaced with USSR.

URSS may also refer to:

- Editorial URSS, a Russian scientific publishing house
- Amicii URSS, literary Romanian for "[The] Friends of the Soviet Union"
- Concerts en URSS, a 1983 album by electronic band Space
- The ICAO airport code for Adler-Sochi International Airport in Russia
