= Eurasian nomads =

Nomadic peoples

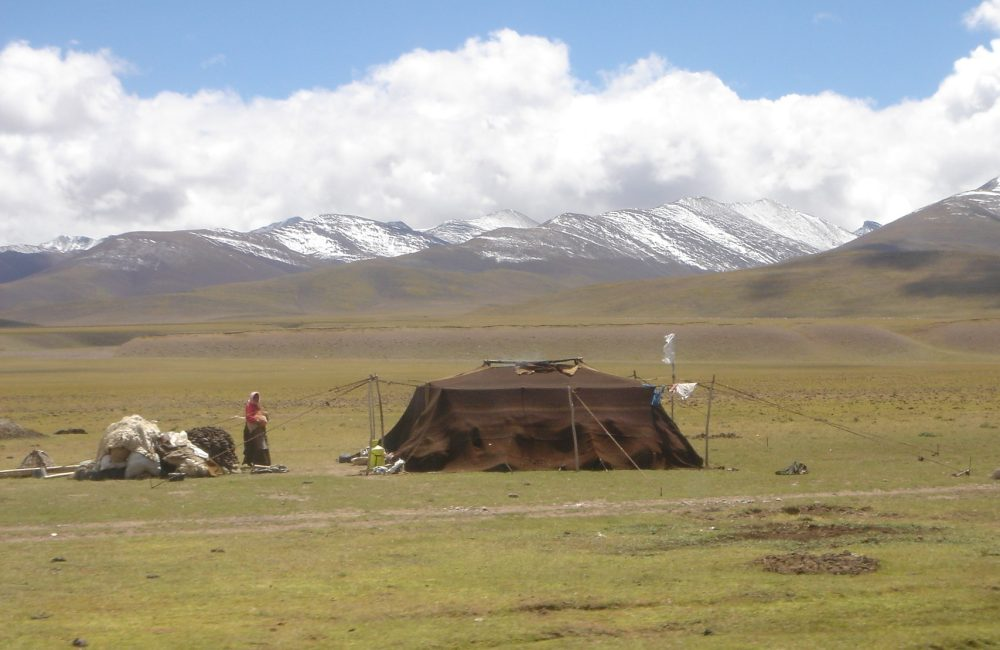
Life of nomads in Eurasian Steppe

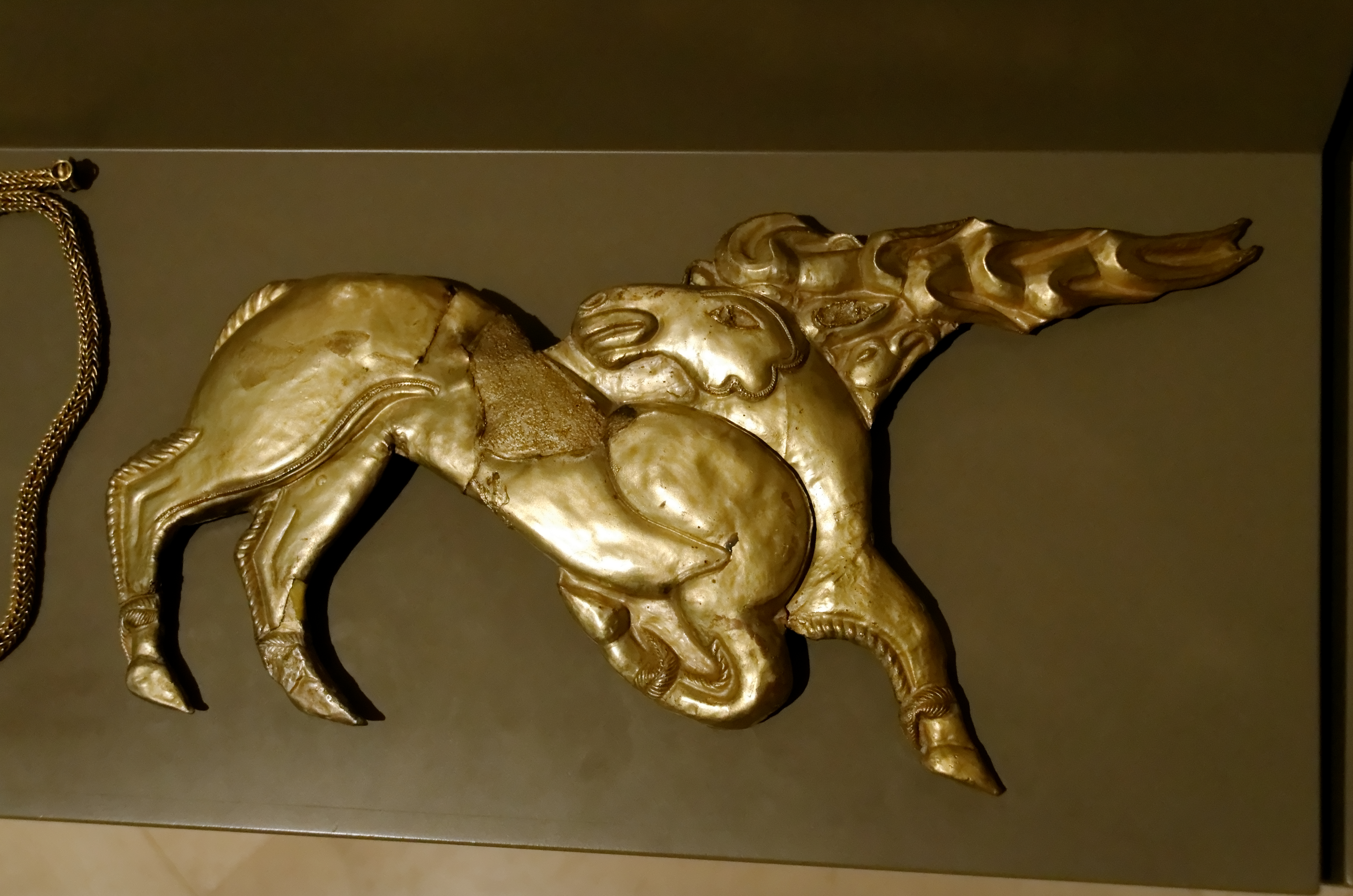
Scythian shield ornament of a deer, in gold

Eurasian nomads form groups of nomadic peoples who have lived in various areas of the Eurasian Steppe. History largely knows them via frontier historical sources from Europe and Asia.

The steppe nomads had no permanent abode, but travelled from place to place to find fresh pasture for their livestock. The generic designation encompasses the varied ethnic groups who have at times inhabited steppe regions of present-day Kazakhstan, Kyrgyzstan, Tajikistan, Turkmenistan, Uzbekistan, Uyghuristan, Mongolia, China, Russia, and Ukraine.

They domesticated the horse around 3500 BCE, vastly increasing the possibilities of nomadic lifestyle, and subsequently their economies and cultures emphasised horse breeding, horse riding, and nomadic pastoralism; this usually involved trading with settled peoples around the edges of the steppe. They developed the chariot, the wagon, cavalry, and horse archery, and introduced innovations such as the bridle, bit, stirrup, and saddle.

The very rapid rate at which innovations crossed the steppelands spread these innovations widely, making them available for copying by settled peoples living in areas bordering the steppes. During the Iron Age, Scythian cultures emerged among the Eurasian nomads, which were characterized by a distinct Scythian art.

== History ==
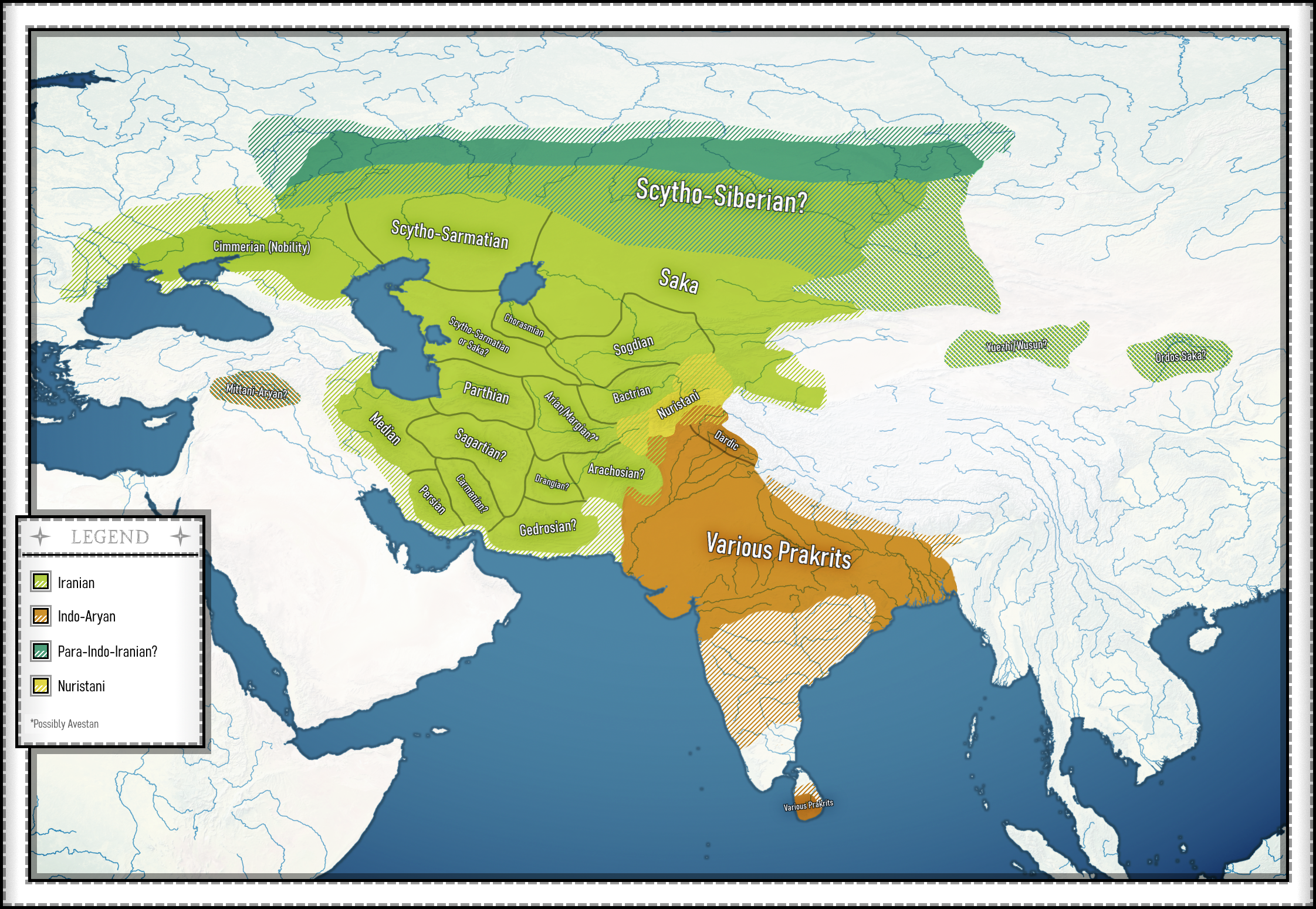
Map of various Iranic nomadic peoples in Central Asia during the Iron Age highlighted in green

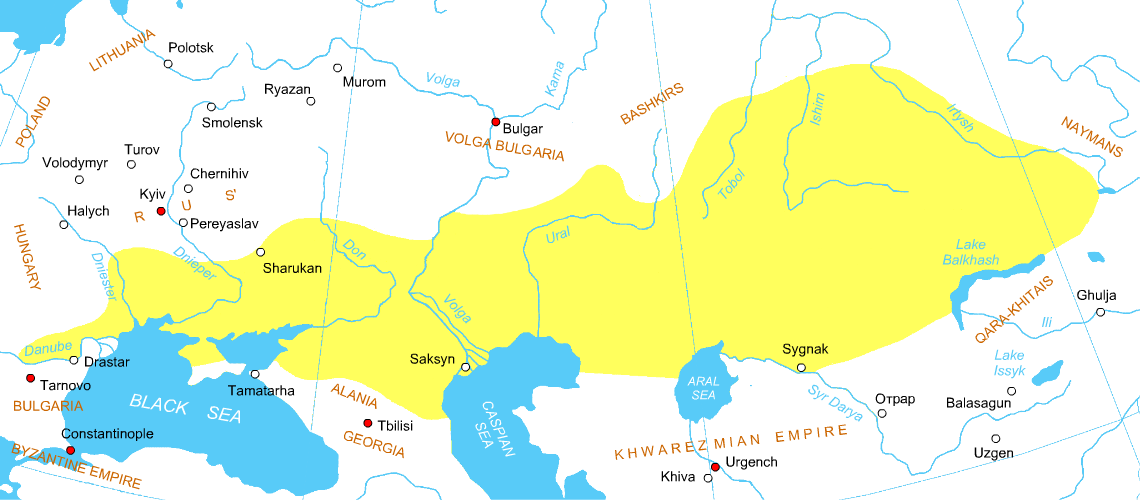
Cuman–Kipchak confederation in Eurasia c. 1200

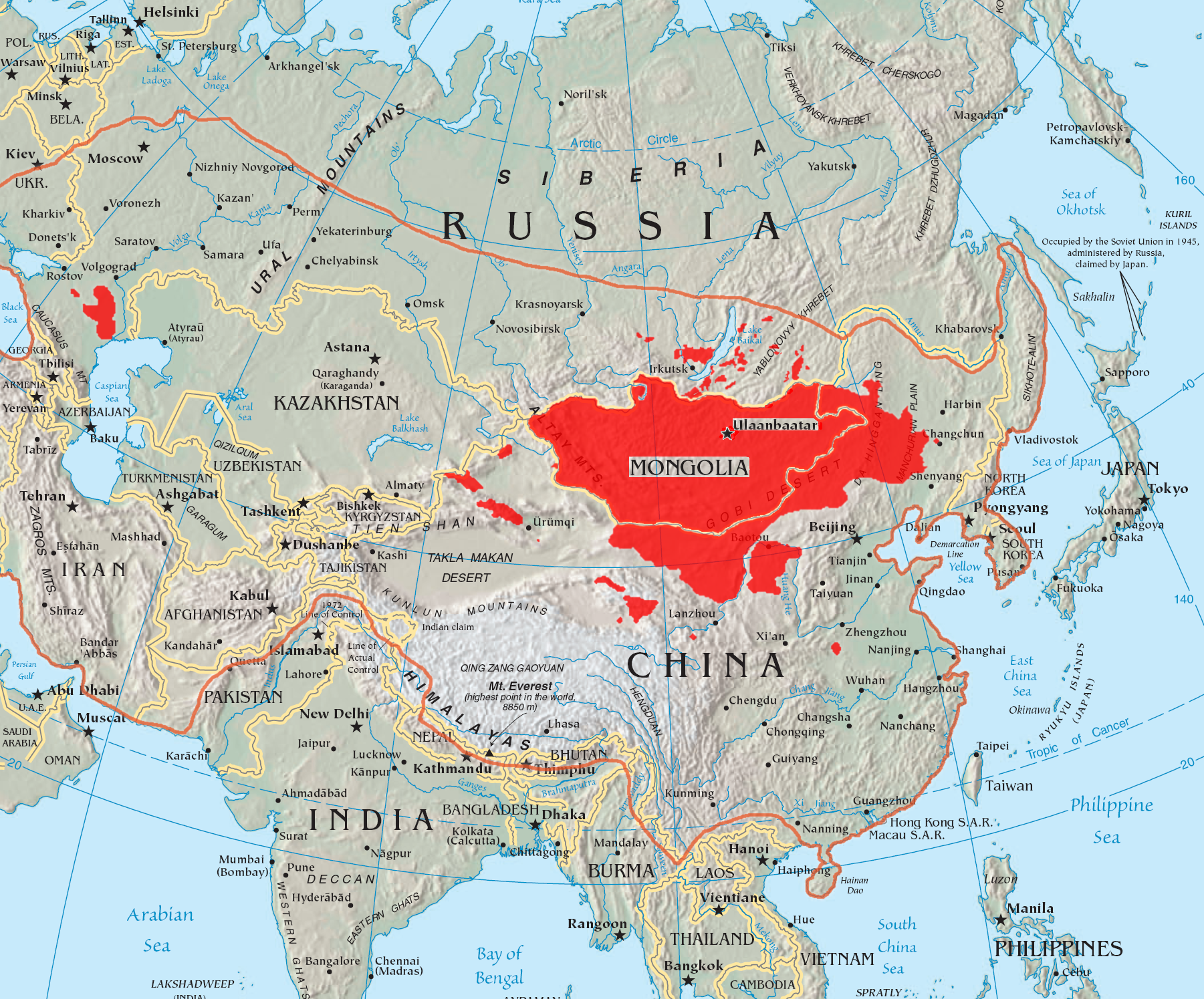
The boundary of 13th century Mongol Empire and location of today's Mongols in modern Mongolia, Russia and China

Scythia was a loose state or federation covering most of the steppe, that originated as early as the 8th century BCE, composed mainly of people speaking Scythian languages and usually regarded as the first of the nomad empires. The Scythians were Iranic pastoralist tribes who dwelled the Eurasian Steppes from the Tarim Basin and Western Mongolia in Asia to as far as Sarmatia in modern day Ukraine and Russia. The Roman army hired Sarmatians as elite cavalrymen. Europe was exposed to several waves of invasions by horse people, including the Cimmerians. The Scythians and Sarmatians enjoyed a long age of dominion in the 1st Millennium BCE, but at the start of 1st Millennium CE they were displaced by waves of immigrations of other people, to the East, in the steppes east of the Caspian Sea. They were dislocated by the Yuezhi people and were forced to assimilate into them, and many of these Eastern Scythians (Saka) moved and settled in the Parthian Empire in the region later named as Sakastan.

The western Iranians, the Alans and Sarmatians, settled down and became the ruling elite of several eastern Slavic tribes and some of these Iranians also assimilated into the Slavic cultures, while others retained their Iranian identity, and their languages are spoken today by the modern Ossetian people. Various peoples also expanded and contracted later in history, including the Magyars in the Early Middle Ages, the Mongols and Seljuks in the High Middle Ages, the Kalmuks and the Kyrgyz and later the Kazakhs up to modern times. The earliest example of an invasion by a horse people may have been by the Proto-Indo-Europeans themselves, following the domestication of the horse in the 4th millennium BCE (see Kurgan hypothesis). The Cimmerians were the earliest invading equestrian steppe nomads that are known in Eastern European sources. Their military strength was always based on cavalry, and they were among the first to have developed true cavalry.

Historically, areas to the north of China including Manchuria, Mongolia and Xinjiang were inhabited by nomadic tribes. Early periods in Chinese history involved conflict with the nomadic peoples to the west of the Wei valley. Texts from the Zhou dynasty (c. 1050–256 BCE) compare the Rong, Di and Qin dynasty to wolves, describing them as cruel and greedy. Iron and bronze were supplied from China. An early theory proposed by Owen Lattimore suggesting that the nomadic tribes could have been self-sufficient was criticized by later scholars, who questioned whether their raids may have been motivated by necessity rather than greed. Subsequent studies noted that nomadic demand for grain, textiles and ironware exceeded China's demand for Steppe goods. Anatoly Khazanov identified this imbalance in production as the cause of instability in the Steppe nomadic cultures. Later scholars argued that peace along China's northern border largely depended on whether the nomads could obtain the essential grains and textiles they needed through peaceful means such as trade or intermarriage. Several tribes organized to form the Xiongnu, a tribal confederation that gave the nomadic tribes the upper hand in their dealings with the settled agricultural Chinese people.

During the Tang dynasty, Turks would cross the Yellow River when it was frozen to raid China. Contemporary Tang sources noted the superiority of Turkic horses. Emperor Taizong wrote that the horses were "exceptionally superior to ordinary [horses]". The Xiajiasi (Kyrgyz) were a tributary tribe who controlled an area abundant in resources like gold, tin and iron. The Turks used the iron tribute paid by the Kyrgyz to make weapons, armor and saddle parts. Turks were nomadic hunters and would sometimes conceal military activities under the pretense of hunting. Their raids into China were organized by a khagan and success in these campaigns had a significant influence on a tribal leader's prestige. In the 6th century the Göktürk Khaganate consolidated their dominance over the northern steppe region through a series of military victories against the Shiwei, Khitan, Rouran, Tuyuhun, Karakhoja and Yada. By the end of the 6th century, following the Göktürk civil war, the short-lived empire had split into the Eastern and Western Turkic Khaganates, before it was conquered by the Tang in 630 and 657, respectively.

Nomadism persists in the steppe lands, though it has generally been disapproved of by modern regimes, who have often discouraged it with varying degrees of coercion.

== Culture ==
Social networks were a crucially important part of nomadic life on the Eurasian steppe. Although Eurasian nomads usually considered themselves the descendants of a single ancestor, they also welcomed outsiders to join their tribe. One could do this by becoming a "sworn brother" of a powerful tribal figure, or by forsaking one's own lineage, and becoming a nöker.

Alliances could also be established through intermarriage. Eurasian steppe nomads practiced exogamy, by marrying off women from their tribe to outside groups. It was also common for nomadic men to marry foreign princesses. These marriages were an important part of the empire-building process.

Eurasian steppe nomads shared common Earth-rooted cosmological beliefs based on the themes of sky-worship. Ancient origin-myths of the Turkic peoples often reference caves or mines as a source of their ancestors, which reflects the importance of iron-making among their ancestors.

Ageism was a feature of ancient Eurasian nomad culture. Steppe societies placed a premium on the value of young males, as shown by their harsh treatment of older people. The Alans held their elderly in low regard, and the Saka customarily executed people once they reached a certain age. The Xiongnu often withheld food from older people during times of need or conflict.

Among the Scythians, a third gender existed, known as the Enaree. The Enaree were described by a Greek historian as males with feminine characteristics, who wore female clothing and adopted women's mannerisms. These individuals belonged to the most highly-esteemed elements of Scythian society, and were believed to have had excellent shamanistic abilities. Extant ancient greek sources speculated about the origin of the feminine features of the Enaree, debating whether it they were the result of a religious curse or arose accidentally through excessive horseback riding. The Scythians may have adopted this gender tradition from other Central Asian steppe or Siberian societies. Similar gender variation phenomena have also been documented among Turkic peoples in Central Asia, as well as in other nomads from Siberia.

There is striking uniformity in the material cultures of Eurasian nomads. Cultural borrowing occurred frequently, and cultural influences spread amongst the steppe peoples and affected the art and practices of other groups with whom they came into contact—including the cultures of medieval Europe.

== Chronological division ==
Chronologically, there have been several "waves" of invasions of either Europe, the Near East, India and China from the steppe.

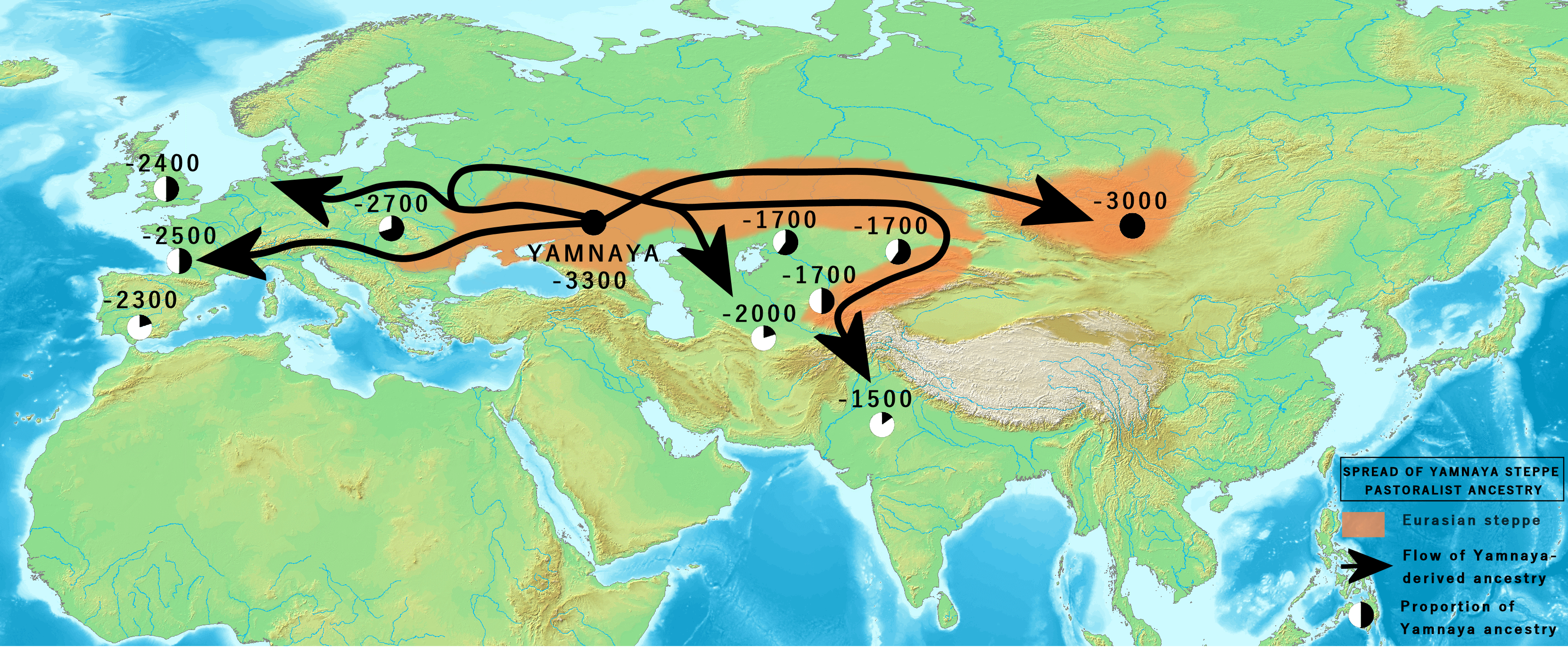
Bronze Age spread of Yamnaya steppe pastoralist ancestry into two subcontinents—Europe and South Asia—from c. 3300 to 1500 BC

Bronze Age
Proto-Indo-Europeans (see Indo-European migrations), Kurgan theory and the later Indo-Aryan migration

Iron Age / Classical Antiquity
Iranian peoples;
- Cimmerians(?)
- Wusun(?)
- Parthians
- Parni
- Saka
- Issedones(?)
- Massagetae
- Scythians
- Sarmatians
- Sigynnae
- Yuezhi(?)
- Hephthalites(?)

Late Antiquity and Migration period
- Alans
- Avars
- Huns
- Xiongnu

Early Middle Ages
Turkic expansion, Magyar invasion;
- Cumans
- Bashkirs
- Burtas
- Bulgars
- Karluks
- Khazars
- Khitan
- Kimaks
- Kipchaks
- Magyars
- Uyghurs
- Gurjars
- Jurchen

High Middle Ages to Early Modern period
Mongol Empire and continued Turkic expansion;
- Mongols
- Turkomen
- Nogais
- Pechenegs
- Tartary
- Kalmyks
- Kazakhs
- Kyrgyz
- Karakalpaks
- Yörüks
- Dzungar Khanate

== See also ==
- Eurasiatic languages
- Inner Asia
- Nomadic empire
- Steppe Route
- Lev Gumilyov
- Scytho-Siberian world

=== By region ===
- Nomadic peoples of Europe
- Nomads of India
- Uralic languages
- Mongolic languages
- Turkic languages
- Ural-Altaic languages

== Bibliography ==
- Amitai, Reuven; Biran, Michal (editors). Mongols, Turks, and others: Eurasian nomads and the sedentary world (Brill's Inner Asian Library, 11). Leiden: Brill, 2005 (ISBN 90-04-14096-4).
- Drews, Robert. Early riders: The beginnings of mounted warfare in Asia and Europe. N.Y.: Routledge, 2004 (ISBN 0-415-32624-9).
- Golden, Peter B. Nomads and their neighbours in the Russian Steppe: Turks, Khazars and Qipchaqs (Variorum Collected Studies). Aldershot: Ashgate, 2003 (ISBN 0-86078-885-7).
- Hildinger, Erik. Warriors of the steppe: A military history of Central Asia, 500 B.C. to A.D. 1700. New York: Sarpedon Publishers, 1997 (hardcover, ISBN 1-885119-43-7); Cambridge, MA: Da Capo Press, 2001(paperback, ISBN 0-306-81065-4).
- Kradin, Nikolay. 2004. Nomadic Empires in Evolutionary Perspective. In Alternatives of Social Evolution. Ed. by N.N. Kradin, A.V. Korotayev, Dmitri Bondarenko, V. de Munck, and P.K. Wason (p. 274–288). Vladivostok: Far Eastern Branch of the Russian Academy of Sciences; reprinted in: The Early State, Its Alternatives and Analogues. Ed. by Leonid Grinin et al. (р. 501–524). Volgograd: Uchitel'.
- Kradin, Nikolay N. 2002. Nomadism, Evolution, and World-Systems: Pastoral Societies in Theories of Historical Development. Journal of World-System Research 8: 368–388.
- Kradin, Nikolay. 2003. Nomadic Empires: Origins, Rise, Decline. In Nomadic Pathways in Social Evolution. Ed. by N.N. Kradin, Dmitri Bondarenko, and T. Barfield (p. 73–87). Moscow: Center for Civilizational Studies, Russian Academy of Sciences.
- Kradin, Nikolay. 2006. Cultural Complexity of Pastoral Nomads. World Cultures 15: 171–189.
- Kradin, Nikolay. Nomads of Inner Asia in Transition. Moscow: URSS, 2014 (ISBN 978-5-396-00632-4).
- Littauer, Mary A.; Crouwel, Joost H.; Raulwing, Peter (Editor). Selected writings on chariots and other early vehicles, riding, and harness (Culture and history of the ancient Near East, 6). Leiden: Brill, 2002 (ISBN 90-04-11799-7).
- Shippey, Thomas "Tom" A. "Goths and Huns: The rediscovery of Northern culture in the nineteenth century", in The Medieval legacy: A symposium. Odense: University Press of Southern Denmark, 1981 (ISBN 87-7492-393-5), pp. 51–69.
