= Mount Lawley Senior High School =

High school in Perth, Western Australia

Location
- Mount Lawley, Perth, Western Australia; Australia; 31°55′17″S 115°52′12″E

Information
- Type: Public co-educational high school
- Motto: Truth and Courtesy
- Established: 1955; 71 years ago
- Educational authority: WA Department of Education
- Principal: Lesley Street
- Years: 7–12
- Enrolment: 1,919 (2021)
- Campus type: Suburban
- Colours: White, navy blue and salmon
- Website: lawley.wa.edu.au

Mount Lawley Senior High School is a public co-educational high school in the City of Stirling, located in Mount Lawley, a northern suburb of Perth, Western Australia. The school consists of three separate sub-schools: Middle School for Years 7 and 8, Upper School for Years 9 and 10 and Senior School for Years 11 and 12.

== House system ==
Mount Lawley has four houses, named after notable Western Australians: Hackett (green), Forrest (red), Murdoch (blue) and O'Connor (yellow).

== Notable alumni ==
- Ben Glatzer, sound engineer and producer
- Marcus Graham, actor
- David Helfgott, pianist
- Tammy MacIntosh, actress
- Dacre Montgomery, actor and poet
- Jeff Newman, television presenter
- Kevin Penkin, anime and video game music composer
- Sam Powell-Pepper, professional Australian rules footballer
- Jaye Radisich, politician
- Nikita Rukavytsya, professional footballer
- James Smillie, actor and singer
- Graeme Snooks, systems theorist and stratologist
- Katy Steele, singer, guitarist and songwriter
- Luke Steele, member of the electronic music duo Empire of the Sun
- Ken Travers, politician
- Alex Williams, actor

== See also ==
- List of schools in the Perth metropolitan area
