= History of Eurasia =

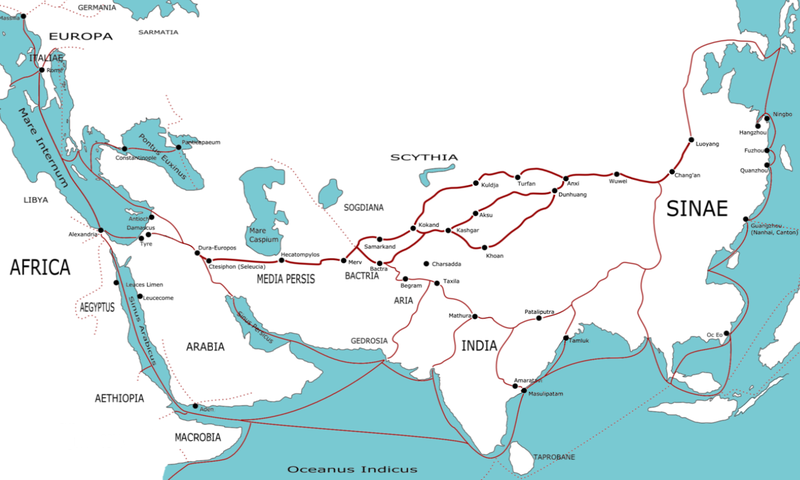
By the time of the Roman Empire, the Silk Road was firmly established.

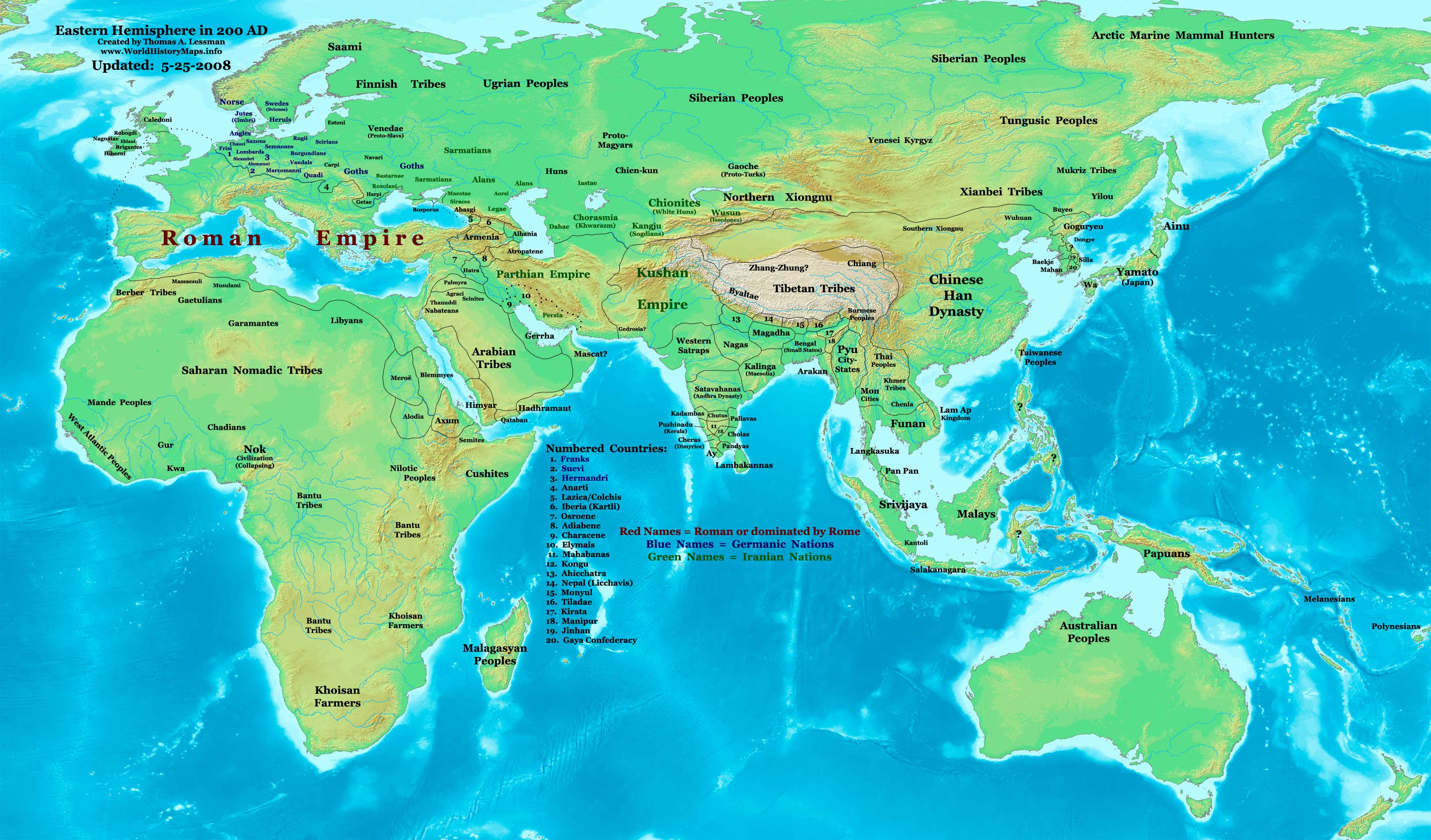
Eurasia around 200 AD

The history of Eurasia is the collective history of a continental area with several distinct peripheral coastal regions: Southwest Asia, South Asia, East Asia, Southeast Asia, and Western Europe, linked by the interior mass of the Eurasian steppe of Central Asia and Eastern Europe. Perhaps beginning with the Steppe Route trade, the early Silk Road, the Eurasian view of history seeks establishing genetic, cultural, and linguistic links between Eurasian cultures of antiquity. Much interest in this area lies with the presumed origin of the speakers of the Proto-Indo-European language and chariot warfare in Central Eurasia.

== Prehistory ==
=== Lower Paleolithic ===
Fossilized remains of Homo ergaster and Homo erectus between 1.8 and 1.0 million years old have been found in Europe (Georgia (Dmanisi), Spain), Indonesia (e.g., Sangiran and Trinil), Vietnam, and China (e.g., Shaanxi). (See also: Multiregional hypothesis.) The first remains are of Oldowan culture, later of Acheulean and Clactonian culture. Finds of later fossils, such as Homo cepranensis, are local in nature, so the extent of human residence in Eurasia during 1,000,000 – 300,000 ybp remains a mystery.

=== Middle Paleolithic ===
Geologic temperature records indicate two intense ice ages dated around 650000 ybp and 450000 ybp. These would have presented any humans outside the tropics unprecedented difficulties. Indeed, fossils from this period are very few, and little can be said of human habitats in Eurasia during this period. The few finds are of Homo antecessor and Homo heidelbergensis, and Lantian Man in China.

After this, Homo neanderthalensis, with his Mousterian technology, emerged, in areas from Europe to western Asia and continued to be the dominant group of humans in Europe and the Middle East up until 40000–28000 ybp. Peking Man has also been dated to this period. During the Eemian Stage, humans probably (e.g. Wolf Cave) spread wherever their technology and skills allowed. The Sahara dried up, forming a difficult area for peoples to cross.

The birth of the first modern humans (Homo sapiens idaltu) has been dated between 200000 and 130000 ybp (see: Mitochondrial Eve, Single-origin hypothesis), that is, to the coldest phase of the Riss glaciation. Remains of Aterian culture appear in the archaeological evidence.

==== Population bottleneck ====
In the beginning of the last ice age a supervolcano erupted in Indonesia. Theory states the effects of the eruption caused global climatic changes for many years, effectively obliterating most of the earlier cultures. Y-chromosomal Adam (90000–60000 BP, dated data) was initially dated here. Neanderthals survived this abrupt change in the environment, so it's possible for other human groups too. According to the theory humans survived in Africa, and began to resettle areas north, as the effects of the eruption slowly vanished. Upper Paleolithic revolution began after this extreme event, the earliest finds are dated c.50000 BC.

A divergence in genetical evidence occurs during the early phase of the glaciation. Descendants of female haplogroups M, N and male CT are the ones found among Eurasian peoples today.

=== Upper Paleolithic ===
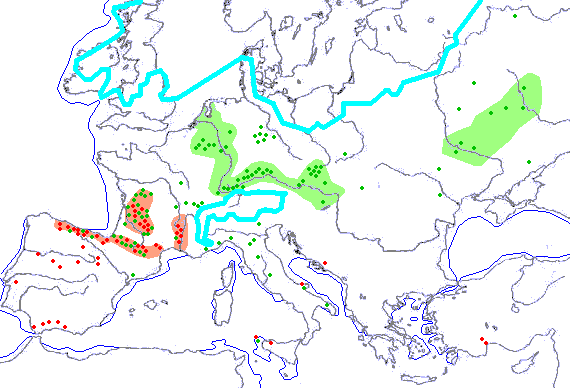
Humans populated all of ice-free Europe during the Upper Paleolithic

The Southern Dispersal scenario postulates the arrival of anatomically modern humans to Eurasia beginning about 70,000 BC. Moving along the southern coast of Asia, they reached Maritime Southeast Asia by about 65,000 years ago. The establishment of population centers in Western Asia, the Indian subcontinent and in East Asia is attested by about 50,000 years ago. The Eurasian Upper Paleolithic proper is taken after c. 45,000 years ago, with the Cro-Magnon expansion into Europe (Mousterian), and the expansion into the Mammoth steppe of Northern Asia.

==== Migrations ====
Tracing back minute differences in the genomes of modern humans by methods of genetic genealogy, can and have been used to produce models of historical migration. Though these give indications of the routes taken by ancestral humans, genetic marker dating is becoming more accurate. The earliest migrations (dated c. 75.000 BP) from the Red Sea shores have been most likely along southern coast of Asia. After this, tracking and timing genetical markers gets increasingly difficult. What is known, is that on areas, of what is now Iraq, Iran, Pakistan and Afghanistan, genetic markers diversify (from about 60000 BC), and subsequent migrations emerge to all directions (even back to the Levant) and North Africa. From the foothills of the Zagros, big game hunting cultures developed which spread across the Eurasian steppe. Crossing the Caucasus and the Ural Mountains were the ancestors of Samoyeds and the ancestors of Uralic peoples, developing sleds, skis and canoes. Through Kazakhstan moved the ancestors of the Indigenous Americans (dated 50000–40000 BC). Eastbound (maybe through Dzungaria and the Tarim Basin went the ancestors of the northern Chinese and Koreans. It is possible that the routes taken by the Indo-European ancestors travelled across the Bosphorus. Genetic evidence suggests a number of separate migrations (1.Anatoleans 2. Tocharians, 3 Celto-Illyrians, 4.Germanic and Slav, – possibly in this order). Archaeological evidence has not been identified for a number of different groups. On historical linguistic evidence, see for example classification of Thracian. The traditional view of associating early Celts with the Hallstatt culture, and the Nordic Bronze Age with Germanic peoples. The Roman Empire spread after the first widespread use of iron outside Central Europe from the Villanovan culture area. Most likely there was trade also in these periods, e.g. with amber and salt being major products.

Influences from northern Africa via Gibraltar and Sicilia cannot be readily discounted. Many other questions remain open, too; for example, Neanderthals were still present at this time. More genetic data is being gathered by various research programs.

=== Early Holocene ===
Primary cultural areas in Europe c.4500 BC

As the ice age ended, major environmental changes happened, such as sea level rise (est. 120m), vegetation changes, and animals disappearing in the Holocene extinction event. At the same time Neolithic Revolution began and humans started to make pottery, began to cultivate crops and domesticated some animal species.

Neolithic cultures in Eurasia are many, and best discussed in separate articles. Some of the articles on this subject include: Natufian culture, Jōmon culture, List of Neolithic cultures of China and Mehrgarh. European sites are many, they are discussed in Prehistoric Europe. The finding of Ötzi the Iceman (dated 3300 BC) provides an important insight to Chalcolithic period in Europe. Proto-languages of various peoples have been forming in this period, though no literal evidence can (by definition) be found. Later migrations further complicate the study of migrations in this period.

== Emergence of civilizations ==
Due to the similarities between Indo-European languages spoken throughout Europe, Iran, and India, it is widely believed that a group originating in the Pontic steppe in the 5th millennium BC spread both east and west, gradually making their way towards the Indian subcontinent and China in the east and western Europe in the west. These Proto-Indo-Europeans spread their languages into the Middle East, India, Europe, and to the borders of China.

Early forms of civilization in Southwest Asia began as early as the 8th millennium BC, in proto-urban centers such as Çatalhöyük. Urban civilizations began to emerge in the Chalcolithic. The earliest urban civilizations in Mesopotamia, India, and China all developed along river valleys. The Uruk period of Mesopotamia dates from about 4000 to 3100 BC and provides the earliest signs of the existence of states in the Near East. Civilizations grew along the Indus River around 3300 BC in Bronze Age India and in 1700 BE along the Yellow River in China. The valleys provided plentiful water and the enrichment of the soil due to annual floods, which made it possible to grow excess crops beyond what was needed to sustain an agricultural village. This allowed for some members of the community to engage in non-agricultural activities, such as the construction of buildings, trade, and social organization. Boats on the river provided an easy and efficient way to transport people and goods, allowing for the development of trade and facilitating central control of outlying areas. Writing likely developed independently in multiple Eurasian civilizations, including Mesopotamia (between 3400 and 3100 BC) and China (1200 BC).

In southern Europe, the Minoan civilization of the Aegean Islands began around 3500 BC, with the complex urban civilization beginning around 2000 BC. It left behind a number of massive building complexes, sophisticated art, and writing systems. Its economy benefited from a network of trade around much of the Mediterranean. By the 2nd millennium BC, the eastern coastlines of the Mediterranean were dominated by the Hittite and Egyptian empires, competing for control over the city states in the Levant.

The Black Sea area was another cradle of European civilization. The prehistoric fortified stone settlement of Solnitsata (5500–4200 BC) is one of the oldest known towns in Europe. The Bronze Age arose in this region during the final centuries of the 4th millennium.

The Bronze Age collapse ended the Late Bronze Age in much of Europe and the Mediterranean region, leading to the Early Iron Age. The Bronze Age collapse may be seen in the context of a technological history that saw the slow, comparatively continuous spread of iron-working technology in the region, beginning in the 13th and 12th centuries BC. The cultural collapse of the Mycenaean kingdoms, the Hittite Empire in Anatolia and Syria, and the Egyptian Empire in Syria and Israel, the scission of long-distance trade contacts and sudden eclipse of literacy occurred between 1206 and 1150 BC. The gradual end of the Dark Age that ensued saw the rise of settled Neo-Hittite Aramaean kingdoms of the mid-10th century BC, and the rise of the Neo-Assyrian Empire.

Phoenician expansion from the Levant beginning in the 12th century BC resulted in a "world-economy". The high point of Phoenician culture and sea power is usually placed ca. 1200–800 BC. The Phoenicians and the Assyrians transported elements of the Late Bronze Age culture of the Near East to Iron Age Greece and Italy, but also further afield to Northwestern Africa and to Iberia, initiating the beginning of Mediterranean history now known as Classical Antiquity. They notably spread alphabetic writing, which would become the hallmark of the Mediterranean civilizations of the Iron Age, in contrast to the cuneiform writing of Assyria and the logographic system in the Far East (and later the abugida systems of India).

The Iron Age made large stands of timber essential to a nation's success because smelting iron required so much fuel, and the pinnacles of human civilizations gradually moved as forests were destroyed. In Europe the Mediterranean region was supplanted by the German and Frankish lands. In the Middle East the main power center became Anatolia with the once dominant Mesopotamia its vassal. In China, the economical, agricultural, and industrial center moved from the northern Yellow River to the southern Yangtze, though the political center remained in the north. In part this is linked to technological developments, such as the mouldboard plough, that made life in once undeveloped areas more bearable.

A map of various routes connecting 1st century Eurasia.

In the Axial Age, China, India, and the Mediterranean formed a continuous belt of civilizations stretching from the Pacific to the Atlantic and connected by the Silk Road.

== Medieval era onward ==
The Indo-Mediterranean was the center of Afro-Eurasian connectivity in general until around 1000 AD, with Warwick Ball and William Dalrymple arguing that the Silk Road's prominence only rose with the Pax Mongolica from the 13th century onwards, and Dalrymple further arguing that until then, the main connecting route in Eurasia was a "Golden Road" going through the Indian Ocean and South Asia.

The rise of Islam on Europe's periphery, notably culminating in the 1453 fall of Constantinople, began to fuel a European self-conceptualization of being a Christendom that was isolated from the broader world. Europe came to sharply distinguish itself from Africa during this time period, though its ties to Asia were left more ambiguous.

=== Modern era ===
At the turn of the 16th century, new routes arose between Europe and Asia as part of the Age of Discovery. For example, Christopher Columbus's 1490s voyages to the Americas aimed to traverse from Atlantic Europe to Pacific Asia by sailing westward. Though he failed, the Spanish and Portuguese empires that followed in his footsteps were to eventually create trading networks like the Manila galleon that connected a variety of Eurasian regions together (see also: Portuguese discovery of the sea route to India).

The 1869 completion of the Suez Canal furthered connectivity and led into the European "New Imperialism" in Asia and Africa, as it enabled direct passage through the Indo-Mediterranean rather than by travelling around Africa. At the same time, the foundations for the Japanese colonial empire in the Asia-Pacific were being laid, as Western learning and trans-Pacific contact with the United States helped Japan modernize itself. Japan's brief rule over Southeast Asia in the mid-20th century played a significant role in removing European dominance in the region.

=== Contemporary era ===
The Soviet Union controlled much of Eurasia in the 20th century.

World War II, which ended in 1945, paved the way for Asia's decolonization from Western and Japanese rule. The Cold War of the late 20th century meant that there was then a conflict between an American-led coalition against the Soviet/communist presence that dominated much of Eurasia. The end of the Cold War in 1991 saw the emergence of several independent states from the former Soviet Union in East Europe and Central Asia.

== See also ==
- Bibliography of the history of Central Asia
- History of Asia
- History of Europe
- History of the Middle East
- History of South Asia
- History of East Asia
- History of Southeast Asia
- History of Central Asia
- History of Afro-Asia
- History of the World
- Indo-European studies
- Indo-Aryan migration hypothesis
- Steppe Route
- Turkic migration
