= Editorial URSS =

Russian publishing house

Editorial URSS is a Russian scientific literature publishing house (textbooks, monographs, journals, proceedings of Russian institutes and universities, etc.). Since 1995, Editorial URSS has issued more than 9000 items in Russian, Spanish, and English.

About 200 books have been issued by Editorial URSS in collaboration with Russian Foundation for Basic Research, Russian Foundation of Humanities and the Open Society Foundations. These books on science and nature (physics, mathematics, chemistry), biology, ecology, medicine, synergetics, social sciences (economics, politics, history, psychology, sociology, philology, languages, etc.) are aimed to the general public.

Books published by URSS around 2005-2007 were sometimes published under the imprint "KomKniga".

== See also ==
- Mir Publishing House

== Select publications ==
- Bondarenko D.M. (2006). Homoarchy: A Principle of Culture’s Organization. The 13th–19th Centuries Benin Kingdom as a Non-State Supercomplex Society. Moscow: URSS.
- Byrd Gene G., Chernin Arthur D., Valtonen Mauri J. (2007). Cosmology: Foundations and Frontiers. Moscow: URSS.
- Korotayev A. & Khaltourina D. (2006). Introduction to Social Macrodynamics: Secular Cycles and Millennial Trends in Africa. Moscow: URSS. ISBN 5-484-00560-4
- Malinietski G.G. (2008). Fundamentos matemáticos de la sinergética. Caos, estructuras y simulación por ordenador. Moscow: URSS.
- Petrashen' M. I., Trifonov E. D. (2002). Application of Group Theory in Quantum Mechanics. 4th ed. Moscow: Editorial URSS. 280 pp. ISBN 5-8360-0480-3
- Turchin, P., et al., eds. (2007). History & Mathematics: Historical Dynamics and Development of Complex Societies. Moscow: KomKniga. ISBN 5-484-01002-0
