= Graeme Snooks =

Graeme Donald Snooks, newly appointed Coghlan Professor, ANU, September 1989

Graeme Donald Snooks (born 1944 in Perth, Western Australia) is a systems theorist and cosmologist who has developed a general dynamic theory to explain complex systems in human society, nature, and the cosmos. His resulting "dynamic-strategy theory" (DST) has been employed to analyse the fluctuating fortunes of life over the past 4,000 million years (myrs) and of human society over the past 2 myrs; to analyse contemporary economic problems (inflation, financial crises, climate change); to explore socio-political issues (population expansion, the emergence of democracy, the "clash of civilizations", disease (COVID-19) control, the failure of strategic leadership); to analyse the emergence, operation, and malfunction of the mind; to suggest how machines can acquire human-level intelligence; to design new worlds in space; to make scientific predictions about the future; to explore key philosophical issues, and to explain the dynamics of the cosmos. New discoveries emerging from Snooks' publications include: existential schizophrenia, strategic frustration, strategic selection, the growth-inflation curve, the strategy function, the logological constant (akin to the cosmological constant), the Snooks–Panov Vertical (or the singularity), technological paradigm shifts, the Solar Revolution, the 'dynamic-strategist' test for Artificial General Intelligence (AGI), the Strategic Superverse, and the strategic logos. His body of work challenges the existing paradigms of orthodox (neo-classical) economics, climate-mitigation economics, Marxism, neo-Darwinism, evolutionary psychology, self-organisation theory, classical cosmology, and all other supply-side systems.

For twenty-one years, from 1989 to 2010, Snooks was the foundation Coghlan Research Professor of Economics in the Institute of Advanced Studies at the Australian National University. Currently he is the executive director of both the Institute of Global Dynamic Systems and IGDS Books in Canberra. He was educated at Mount Lawley Senior High School (1957–1961), the University of Western Australia (BEc, 1966; MEc, 1968), and the Australian National University (PhD, 1972). Snooks has been elected Fellow of the Australian Academy of Social Sciences (1991), Fellow of the Royal Historical Society (UK) (1990), and Fellow of the Russian Academy of Humanities (elected 2006, resigned in protest 2022).

== Books and articles ==
Graeme Donald Snooks, May 2013

Snooks has published some 40 books and monographs, including: Depression and Recovery (1974), Domesday Economy (with J. McDonald) (1986), Economics Without Time (1993), Historical Analysis in Economics (1993), Portrait of the Family within the Total Economy (1994), Was the Industrial Revolution Necessary?, (1994), The Dynamic Society (1996), The Ephemeral Civilization (1997), The Laws of History (1998), Longrun Dynamics (1998), Global Transition (1999), The Global Crisis Makers (2000), The Collapse of Darwinism (2003), The Selfcreating Mind (2006), The Coming Eclipse, or The Triumph of Climate Mitigation Over Solar Revolution (2010), Dead God Rising. Religion and Science in the Universal Life-System (2010). The Death of Zarathustra. Notes on Truth for the Risk-Taker (2011), Ark of the Sun: the improbable voyage of life (November 2015), Ultimate Reality & its Dissidents (March 2016), Time's Gateway: a personal quest for ultimate reality (August 2017), Great Myths to Die For: essays on the ship of metaphysical fools (February 2021), Paradox of a Mindless Artificial Intelligence: the compelling case for a general dynamic theory of the mind (2024), Farewell Dear Fritz: a tribute to Friedrich Nietzsche (2025), Colonising Mars: how to create new worlds in space (2025), Unlocking the Mystery of the Cosmos: A realist general dynamic theory of the Strategic Superverse (2025), The Strategically-Aware Cosmos (2025), and The Dynamic Theory of Everything: life, society, cosmos, and Superverse (2026).

Snooks' book, Ark of the Sun provides an overview of his thinking over five decades on the dynamics of life and human society and reveals the underlying reality of life – the strategic logos – which is the ultimate complex living system. Ultimate Reality & its Dissidents provides a unique philosophy of life based on his realist general dynamic theory. Time's Gateway shows how these ideas emerged over the past fifty years. Great Myths to Die For shows how the metaphysical interventionists are undermining the survival of human civilization. Colonising Mars argues that the Red Planet will not be successfully settled until the Solar Revolution occurs on Earth to provide the huge demands for power to terraform the environment, and until a viable life-system (or strategic logos) is constructed on Mars - both uniquely predicted by his dynamic-strategy theory (DST). And Unlocking the Mystery of the Cosmos shows how the DST can be used to explore not only the dynamics of the universe and the laws that drive it, but also its origins and future as part of the Strategic Superverse.

Articles on the theory of complex living systems have been published by Snooks in Advances in Space Research (2005), Complexity (the journal of the Santa Fe Institute) (2008), and Social Evolution & History (2002, 2005, 2007). In a November 2016 article – "The Triumph of Trump and the failure of the intellectuals" – he applies the dynamic-strategy theory to the recent US presidential election and provides suggestions for the type of dynamic strategy that the USA would need to pursue in order to "make America great again" and to position itself at the forefront of a forthcoming technological paradigm shift. And in November 2024, he chartered a Strategic Roadmap that the second Trump Presidency could employ to Make America Great Again. Snooks's most recent articles include: "Exploding the great singularity myth" (February 2019), which critically examines the futuristic concept known as the technological singularity – an issue that he first addressed in his 1996 book The Dynamic Society; "Exploding the Great Climate Mitigation Myth" (May 2019), which claims that the impact of the economic interventions to address climate change have been grossly underestimated; "Fight the Virus (COVID-19), Not the Economy! How to Avoid the 'Interventionist Storm'" (March 2020), which discusses the dangers of complete economic shut-down; "COVID-19 and the Great Lockdown Fiasco" (April 2020), which claims that the emerging 'lockdown depression' is the outcome of a failure of strategic leadership in Western Civilization that has been emerging since the late 20th century; and "Will the world ever recover from the Great Lockdown? Counting the costs of waging war on the economy", which estimates and analyses the impact of massive government intervention on world real GDP and GDP per capita in both the short and long term. In 2022 Snooks published a series of papers on the philosophical implications of his dynamic-strategy theory and his discovery of the strategic logos—including the nature of humanity, freedom, truth, evil, and the meaning of life. More recently (2023 and 2024) he has shown how artificial general intelligence (AGI) will only be achieved once the AI community expands to include the essential science of life-dynamics and adopts a realist general dynamic theory of the mind.

International Response to Snooks's Work. In international academic circles Snooks is widely recognised as a bold and innovative interdisciplinary thinker. Some argue that his dynamic-strategy theory is able to integrate history, economics, sociology, politics, psychology, evolutionary biology, cosmology, and philosophy into a grand synthesis. He is also viewed as a significant contemporary iconoclastic thinker, deconstructing prevailing intellectual paradigms in the life sciences and replacing them with transformative ideas. Internationally, Snooks's work has sparked a range of discussions in conferences and significant publications in both the social and natural sciences, as well as in systems theory. Further, it is considered by some that his work offers a unique perspective that bridges empirical analysis with philosophical enquiry. The main criticism is that Snooks is intellectually too ambitious, and that his work is too holistic.

== See also ==
- Big History
- Complex systems
