= Social Evolution & History =

- Discipline: History, anthropology, sociology, philosophy
- Language: English

Publication details
- History: 2002-present
- Publisher: Uchitel Publishing House (Russia)
- Frequency: Biannual

Standard abbreviations
- ISO 4: Soc. Evol. Hist.

Indexing
- ISSN: 1681-4363
- OCLC no.: 50573883

Links
- Journal homepage; Online archive

Social Evolution & History is a peer-reviewed academic journal focused on the development of human societies in the past, present, and future. In addition to original research articles, Social Evolution & History includes critical notes and a book review section. It is published in English twice a year, in March and September, by Uchitel Publishing House. The editors-in-chief are Dmitri Bondarenko, Leonid Grinin, and Andrey Korotayev.

== Special issues ==
Social Evolution & History has published several special issues devoted to questions in social evolution:

- Ernest Gellner special memorial issue (guest editor: P. Skalnik)
- Exploring the Horizons of Big History (guest editor: G. D. Snooks)
- Thirty Years of Early State Research (guest editors: H. J. M. Claessen, R. Hagesteijn, P. van de Velde)
- Analyses of Cultural Evolution (guest editor: H. Barry)

== Indexing ==
The journal is indexed in:

- Scopus
- Ulrich's database
- ERIH
- Russian Science Citation Index.

== See also ==
- Big History
