= Gerard Fairtlough =

English author, speaker and management thinker

Gerard Fairtlough

Gerard Fairtlough CBE (5 September 1930 – 15 December 2007) was an English author, speaker and management thinker.

Born on Hayling Island, Hampshire, Fairtlough trained initially as a biochemist at Cambridge University. He worked for 25 years in the Royal Dutch Shell group, where he spent the last 5 years as Chief Executive of Shell Chemicals UK.

In 1980, he founded the biopharmaceuticals firm Celltech and remained its chief executive until 1990. He subsequently founded the publishing company Triarchy Press and was involved in the formation of a number of high-tech businesses.

Fairtlough served as an advisor to several UK government and academic institutions. He was Specialist Advisor to the British House of Commons Select committee on Science and Technology, Chair of the Advisory Panel on Science Policy Research Unit at the University of Sussex, and a member of the UK Science and Engineering Council.

Gerard Fairtlough developed and elaborated his theory of triarchy and was the author of The Three Ways of Getting Things Done: Hierarchy, Heterarchy & Responsible Autonomy in Organisations, Creative Compartments: A Design for Future Organisation, and co-author with Julie Allan and Barbara Heinzen of The Power of the Tale: Using Narratives for Organisational Success. He also wrote extensively on the theory and practice of organization design and management and of innovation.

In 1954, Fairtlough married Lisa Betambeau (they had two sons and two daughters); he died in Ryall, Dorset on 15 December 2007.

He also has six grandchildren: Zoe, Tanya, Aurora, Zachery, Sorrel, Bidwell.
