= Uchitel Publishing House =

Russian publishers

"Uchitel" Publishing House
- Founded: 1989
- Headquarters: Volgograd, Russia
- Website: uchitel-izd.ru socionauki.ru

"Uchitel" Publishing House is one of the biggest regional publishing houses in Russia. According to the journal “Knizhnoe Delo” it ranks 23rd in all-Russian rating and 2nd among non-capital publishing houses.

== General Information ==
The publishing house was founded in 1989. “Uchitel” Publishing House specializes in producing educational and methodical literature. It offers a wide range of educational and methodical literature, visual aids and multimedia in all subjects and for all types of educational organizations, organizations of preschool and additional education. The publishing house issues book output and CDs for teachers, chiefs of educational institutions, kindergartens, students, school leavers and undergraduates. There are more than a thousand of items of constantly replicated own editions.

“Uchitel” produces more than 40 new books and 8–10 multimedia products monthly. At present there are around 3000 aids in more than 80 series on offer.

The publications are distributed through wholesale and retail trade, dealers and book stores. There is a special department “Books by Post” – one can order aids from the catalogue and cash them on delivery.

== Publishing activities ==
- Literature for the authorities of educational organizations
- Literature for school education
- Literature for primary, secondary schools.
- Special literature (for psychologists, speech therapists and pathologists etc.)
