= Dmitri Bondarenko =

Russian historian, anthropologist and Africanist

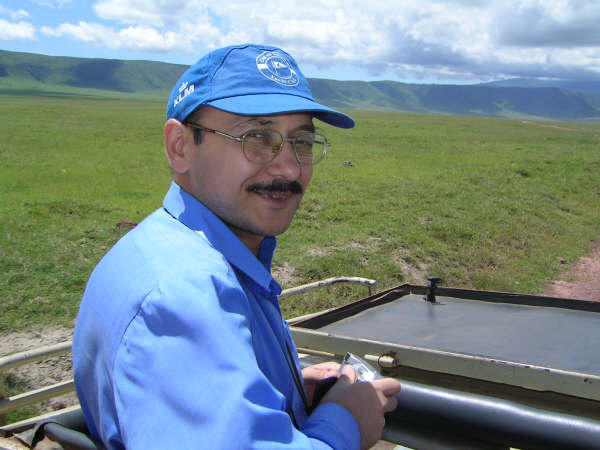
- Dmitri Bondarenko in Tanzania, April 2005
- Born: June 9, 1968 (age 58); Moscow, Soviet Union
- Education: Moscow State University
- Known for: contributions to anthropology and African Studies
- Awards: Main academic awards: Anniversary medal "300 years of the Russian Academy of Sciences" (2024) ; Russian Academy of Sciences Nikolay Miklukho Maklay prize “for outstanding contribution to Ethnology and Anthropology” (for the monograph Post-colonial Nations in Historical and Cultural Context) (2023); Grant of the Foundation for National Science Support for outstanding young D.Sc. holders (2008, 2009); European Academy prize for young CIS scholars (for the monograph Benin on the Eve of the First Contacts with Europeans: Personality. Society. Authority) (1997); State awards and titles: Medal of the Order "For Merit to the Fatherland" 2nd class (2024); Labor Veteran (2015); Medal "In Commemoration of the 850th Anniversary of Moscow" (1997)
- Scientific career
- Fields: cultural anthropology, political anthropology, African Studies, world history
- Workplaces: Institute of Oriental Studies, Russian Academy of Sciences; National Research University Higher School of Economics; Russian State University for the Humanities

Dmitri Mikhailovich Bondarenko (Russian: Дми́трий Миха́йлович Бондаре́нко, IPA: [ˈdmʲitrʲɪj mʲɪˈxajləvʲɪdʑ bəndɐˈrʲenkə]; born June 9, 1968) is a Russian anthropologist, historian, and Africanist. He has conducted field research in a number of African countries (particularly, Tanzania, Nigeria, Benin, Rwanda, Zambia, Uganda) and among Black people in Russia and the United States. He is Vice-Director for Research, Chair of the Department of Anthropology of the East, and Principal Research Fellow with the Institute of Oriental Studies of the Russian Academy of Sciences, Director of the International Center of Anthropology of the HSE University, and Full Professor in Ethnology with the Center of Social Anthropology of the Russian State University for the Humanities. He holds the titles of Professor in Ethnology from the Lomonosov Moscow State University, Professor of the Russian Academy of Sciences in Global Problems and International Relations, and Corresponding Member of the Russian Academy of Sciences in History.

Bondarenko was a visiting scholar with the Northwestern University (United States), Institut für Geschichte (Germany), and Maison des sciences de l'homme (France). He has delivered guest lectures at universities of Russia, the United States, Egypt, Tanzania, Slovenia, Angola, and Uganda. Bondarenko is a member of the Executive Committee of the Africanist Network of the "European Association of Social Anthropologists", for which he also served as the Committee Chairperson in 2006–2008. Dmitri Bondarenko is a co-founder and co-editor of "Social Evolution & History".

In 1990 - 2024, Bondarenko worked for the Institute for African Studies of the Russian Academy of Sciences, in 2008 - 2024 as a Vice-Director for Research.

== Education ==
Bondarenko graduated with the M.A. degree in 1990 from the Moscow State University, Department of Ethnography, School of History. He completed his Ph.D. in 1993 at Russian Academy of Sciences. He also holds Doctor of Sciences degree (2000) from the Russian Academy of Sciences.

== Research interests and major contributions ==
Social theory, anthropological and historical theory, political anthropology, pre-industrial societies, cultures and history of Africa, socio-cultural transformations and intercultural interaction in contemporary world (including ethnic, racial, and religious aspects, migration issues) with special focus on Africa and people of African descent worldwide

Bondarenko has introduced (together with Andrey Korotayev) and started elaborating the notion of homoarchy to be coupled with the one of heterarchy, noting that the heterarchy (defined as "the relation of elements to one another when they are unranked or when they possess the potential for being ranked in a number of different ways") is not the opposite of any hierarchy all together, but is rather the opposite of "homoarchy", defined as "the relation of elements to one another when they are rigidly ranked one way only, and thus possess no (or not more than very limited) potential for being unranked or ranked in another or a number of different ways at least without cardinal reshaping of the whole socio-political order".

Basing primarily on the precolonial Benin Kingdom evidence, Bondarenko has elaborated the conception of "megacommunity" as a specific type of the non-state supercomplex society, integration of a supercomplex (exceeding the complex chiefdom level) society on community (and hence non-state) basis being its main distinctive feature. He has contributed to the studies of the state origins and nature by dealing with such aspects of the problematics as the dynamics of kinship and territoriality as principles of socio-political organization, transformations in ideology, and others.

In publications on contemporary issues Bondarenko argues, in particular, that globalization should be viewed as a primarily cultural, not economic and political, phenomenon which is by no means a recently appeared one but which embraces essentially the whole human history, and which can turn out a "successful historical project" in the shape of a "federation of local civilizations" only.

== Publications ==
Bondarenko has authored over 600 publications including 8 individual monographs, 5 of which are in English:

- Principles and Forms of Sociocultural Organization: Historical Contexts of Interaction. London; New York: Anthem Press, 2026. 280 P. (with G.V. Aleksandrov).
- Post-Colonial Nations in Historical and Cultural Context. Lanham, MD: Lexington Books, 2023.
- African Americans and American Africans: Migration, Histories, Race and Identities. Canon Pyon: Sean Kingston Publishing, 2019.
- The Axial Ages of World History: Lessons for the 21st Century. Litchfield Park, AZ: Emergent Publications, 2014 (with K. Baskin).
- Homoarchy as a Principle of Culture's Organization. The 13th-19th Centuries Benin Kingdom as a Non-State Supercomplex Society. Moscow: URSS, 2006.
- A Popular History of Benin. The Rise and Fall of a Mighty Forest Kingdom. Frankfurt am Main etc.: Peter Lang, 2003 (with P.M. Roese).

Among the volumes and journal special issues co-edited by Bondarenko are:

- Political Parties in Africa (Special Issue of Journal of the Institute for African Studies. 2023, № 2 [63]).
- The Evolution of Social Institutions: Interdisciplinary Perspectives. Cham: Springer, 2020.
- The Omnipresent Past. Historical Anthropology of Africa and African Diaspora. Moscow: LRC Publishing House, 2019.
- Plural Trajectories: Introduction to African Futures (Special Issue of Journal of the Institute for African Studies. 2019, № 2 [47]).
- State Building, States, and State Transformation in Africa (Special Issue of Social Evolution and History. 2018. Vol. 17, № 1).
- Anthropology, History, and Memory in Sub-Saharan Africa. In Memoriam Michel Izard (Special Issue of Social Evolution and History. 2014. Vol. 13, № 2).
- Alternativeness in Cultural History: Heterarchy and Homoarchy as Evolutionary Trajectories. Moscow: Center for Civilizational and Regional Studies Press, 2007.
- The Early State, Its Alternatives and Analogues. Volgograd: Uchitel’, 2004.
- Nomadic Pathways in Social Evolution. Moscow: Center for Civilizational and Regional Studies Press, 2003.
- Alternatives of Social Evolution. Vladivostok: FEB RAS, 2000.
- Civilizational Models of Politogenesis. Moscow: Institute for African Studies Press, 2000.
