= Henri J. M. Claessen =

Dutch political anthropologist (1930-2022)

Henri Joannes Maria Claessen (30 November 1930 – 26 July 2022) was a Dutch cultural anthropologist who specialised in the early state. He was Professor Emeritus in Social Anthropology at Leiden University, as well as an honorary member of several scholarly institutions (Koninklijk Instituut voor Taal-, Land- en Volkenkunde [Royal Institute for Languages and Anthropology of the Royal Academy of Sciences]); Center for Asian and Pacific Studies (University of Nijmegen); Honorary Lifetime Member of the IUAES (International Union of Anthropological and Ethnological Sciences).

== Background and education ==
Henri Joannes Maria Claessen was born in Wormerveer on 30 November 1930. He studied geography, history and anthropology at Amsterdam University (1950–1956). After his MA Claessen became a teacher of social geography in Sint Adelbert College (1956–1970), a period during which he prepared his PhD thesis under A. Köbben's supervision. He obtained his PhD at Amsterdam (1970). After that he was appointed Associate Professor at Leiden University in the Department of Anthropology. In 1984 he became full Professor there, in 1989–1991 he was the Dean of Faculty of Social Sciences (Faculteit der Sociale Wetenschappen) and in 1994 he retired from the university. In 1981–1982 Claessen was Fellow in The Netherlands Institute for Advanced Studies. From 1977–1994 he was Editor of Bijdragen tot de Taal-, Land- en Volkenkunde. In this period Henri J. M. Claessen was also active in the IUAES, which organization he served as Vice-President from 1982–1992. Claessen died on 26 July 2022, at the age of 91.

== Early State Research ==
Henri Claessen has devoted much of his scholarly career to the study of Early States. The concept of the early state introduced by Henri J. M. Claessen and Peter Skalník appears to have been the last among the great epoch-making political-anthropological theories of the 1960s and 1970s. Claessen's thesis, Of Princes and Peoples, a comparative study of the political organization of five Early States (Tahiti, Tonga, Dahomey, Buganda and the Realm of the Incas) where the emphasis came to be the central political organisation, which has remained an important theme in much of Claessen's work, lay at the basis of The Early State (1978) which he edited with Peter Skalník. In 1981, again with Peter Skalník, he edited The Study of the State. In later years he edited with M. Estellie Smith and Pieter van de Velde Development and Decline (1985). In this work the emphasis fell on evolutionary aspects of state formation. With Pieter van de Velde he edited in 1987 Early State Dynamics, and in 1991 Early State Economics. To connect matters of ideology and legitimacy, he edited with Jarich G. Oosten in 1996 Ideology and the Formation of Early States. In his Structural Change was given a survey of evolution and evolutionism in Cultural anthropology. With Renée Hagesteijn and Pieter van de Velde he edited a special issue of Social Evolution & History under the title Thirty Years of Early State Research (2008). Apart from a number of publications in Dutch, he contributed articles in English on traditional Polynesia in Bijdragen tot de Taal-, Land- en Volkenkunde, and articles on evolutionism in Social Evolution & History where he is a member of the Editorial Council.

== Complex Interaction Model ==
Claessen's school developed a "Complex Interaction Model" (CIM) to explain the evolution of sociopolitical organization and early state formation. According to the model factors such as ideology, economy and societal format become aligned in ways which favour state organisation.

Not only the number of people was relevant, but also the number of people in relation to the means of production, and the spatial distribution of the population, which both played a role in the evolution of socio-political organization. We therefore coined the term societal format, which covers the number of people, possible population pressure, and spatial distribution)

== Selected works ==
- 1978. The Early State: A Structural Approach. In Claessen, H. J. M., and Skalník, P. (eds.), The Early State (pp. 533–596). The Hague: Mouton.
- 1981. Specific Features of the African Early State. In Claessen, H. J. M., and Skalník, P. (eds.), The Study of the State (pp. 59–86). The Hague: Mouton.
- 1983. Evolutionary or not evolutionary; That's the question. Reviews in Anthropology 10: 21-24
- 1984. The Internal Dynamics of the Early State. Current Anthropology 25: 365–379
- 1985. From the Franks to France; The Evolution of a Political Organization. In Claessen, H. J. M., van de Velde, P., and Smith, M. E. (eds.), Development and Decline (pp. 196–218). South Hadley, MA: Bergin & Garvey.
- 1989. Evolutionism in Development. Vienne Contributions to Ethnology and Anthropology 5: 231–247.
- 1991. Verdwenen koninkrijken en verloren beschavingen [Disappeared Kingdoms and Lost Civilizations]. Assen: Van Gorcum.
- 1996. Ideology and the formation of early states: Data from Polynesia. In. H. J.M. Claessen and J. G. Oosten (Eds.), Ideology and the formation of early states (pp. 339–358). Leiden: Brill.
- 2000. Structural Change; Evolution and Evolutionism in Cultural Anthropology. Leiden: CNWS Press.
- 2002. Was the State Inevitable? Social Evolution & History 1(1) : 101–117 .
- 2005. Early State Intricacies. Social Evolution & History 4(2): 151–158 .
- 2006. with Martin A. van Bakel: Theme and variations. The development of differences in Polynesian socio-political organizations. In: Bijdragen tot de Taal-, Land- en Volkenkunde. 162:218-268.
- 2008. Before the Early State and After. Social Evolution & History 7(1): 4–18 .
- 2009. Learning and training. Education in eighteenth century traditional Polynesia. In: Bijdragen tot de Taal-, Land- en Volkeknkunde 165: 324-356.
- 2010 On early states - structure, development, and fall. In: Social Evolution and History 9(1):3-51 .
- 2011 On Chiefs and Chiefdoms In: Social Evolution and History 10(1) .
- 2011 Reconsideration or a Reformulation. In: Social Evolution and History 11(2) .
- Claessen, H. J. M. & P. Kloos. Evolutie en evolutionisme (1978).
- Claessen, H. J. M. & P. van de Velde. Een intercultureel model voor het feodalisme. In: Evomatica, ed. by Pieter van de Velde, pp. 203–215. Leiden: Institute of Cultural Anthropology Publication 42. (1981)
- Claessen, H. J. M. & P. van de Velde. Complexe interactie. Een process-model ter verklaring van de evolutie van de sociaal-politieke organisatie. Antropologische Verkenningen 3: 120-136.(1984)

== See also ==
- Henri Claessen
- Bondarenko D. M. Claessen H. J. M. In Great Russian Encyclopedia. Vol. 14 / Ed. by Yu. M. Osipov. Moscow: Russian Encyclopedia, 2009. P. 220.
- Dmitri Bondarenko, Andrey Korotayev. 'Early State' in Cross-Cultural Perspective: A Statistical Reanalysis of Henri J. M. Claessen’s Database. Cross-Cultural Research February 2003, vol. 37, no. 1, 105-132.
- Jean-Claude Muller. Compte Rendus de Henri J. M. Claessen and Peter Skalnik (Eds.): The Early State. New Babylon. Studies in the Social Sciences. Anthropologie et Sociétés, vol. 4, n° 1, 1980, p. 181-185.
- Carneiro's Circumscription Theory
- Surplus product
