= Circumscription =

Circumscription may refer to:

- Circumscribed circle
- Circumscription (logic)
- Circumscription (taxonomy)
- Circumscription theory, a theory about the origins of the political state in the history of human evolution proposed by the American anthropologist Robert Carneiro
- Electoral district
