= Robert L. Carneiro =

American anthropologist (1927–2020)

Robert Leonard Carneiro (June 4, 1927 – June 24, 2020) was an American anthropologist and curator of the American Museum of Natural History who is widely held to be one of the prominent sociocultural evolutionists. He is mostly known for his Circumscription theory which explains how early political states may have formed as a result of interactions between environmental constraints, population pressures, and warfare.

Carneiro was born of Cuban parents in New York City. He took his first course in anthropology as an undergraduate at the University of Michigan, while studying Political Science with the goal of becoming a lawyer. His teacher in that first course was Leslie White and during that course he discovered that anthropology was what he was really looking for. Later Carneiro took two more classes with White and also with Elman Service.

As a graduation gift, his father (who hoped his son would run the family business someday) arranged for a trip around the globe on an ocean liner. After the trip, Carneiro began work at his father's company, manufacturing presses used to print magazines and newspapers. Traveling the world, however, had more fueled Carneiro's interest in anthropology, so he returned to the University of Michigan to become White's graduate student. His graduate research took him to Brazil where fieldwork with an indigenous people, the Kuikuro, revealed large earthworks and ancient trenches. Based on those observations, he earned a Ph.D. in 1957, and went on to teach at several universities. In 1999, he was elected to the National Academy of Sciences.

Carneiro worked toward a general theory, to explain the emergence of political culture, strongly opposed to humanistic and non-scientific tendencies in anthropology and to history for its lack of scientific approach. Besides cultural evolution, he worked also on political evolution and South American ethnology. His main work remains influential, but also has its critics.

== List of selected works ==
- "A Theory of the Origin of the State". Science. 169 (3947) (1970): 733–738.
- "The Transition From Quantity to Quality: A Neglected Causal Mechanism in Accounting for Social Evolution." Proceedings of the National Academy of Sciences 97 (2000): 12926–12931.
- "Process vs. Stages: A False Dichotomy in Tracing the Rise of the State." In Alternatives of Social Evolution. Ed. by Nikolay Kradin, Andrey Korotayev, Dmitri Bondarenko, Victor de Munck, and Paul Wason, pp. 52–58. Vladivostok: Far Eastern Branch of the Russian Academy of Sciences, 2000.
- The Muse of History and the Science of Culture. New York: Kluwer Academic/Plenum Publishers, 2000
- "What Happened at Flashpoint? Conjectures on Chiefdom Formation at the Very Moment of Conception." In Chiefdoms and Chieftaincy in the Americas. Ed. by Elsa M. Redman, pp. 18–42. Gainesville: University Press of Florida, 1998.
- Evolutionism in Cultural Anthropology: A Critical History. Westview Press, Boulder, CO, 2003.
- The Evolution of the Human Mind From Supernaturalism to Naturalism, An Anthropological Perspective. New York: Eliot Werner Publications, Inc., 2010.
- The Checkered History of the Circumscription Theory. AuthorHouse, Bloomington, IN, 2018.

== See also ==
- Stephen K. Sanderson
