= Evolutionism =

Derogatory term for the theory of evolution

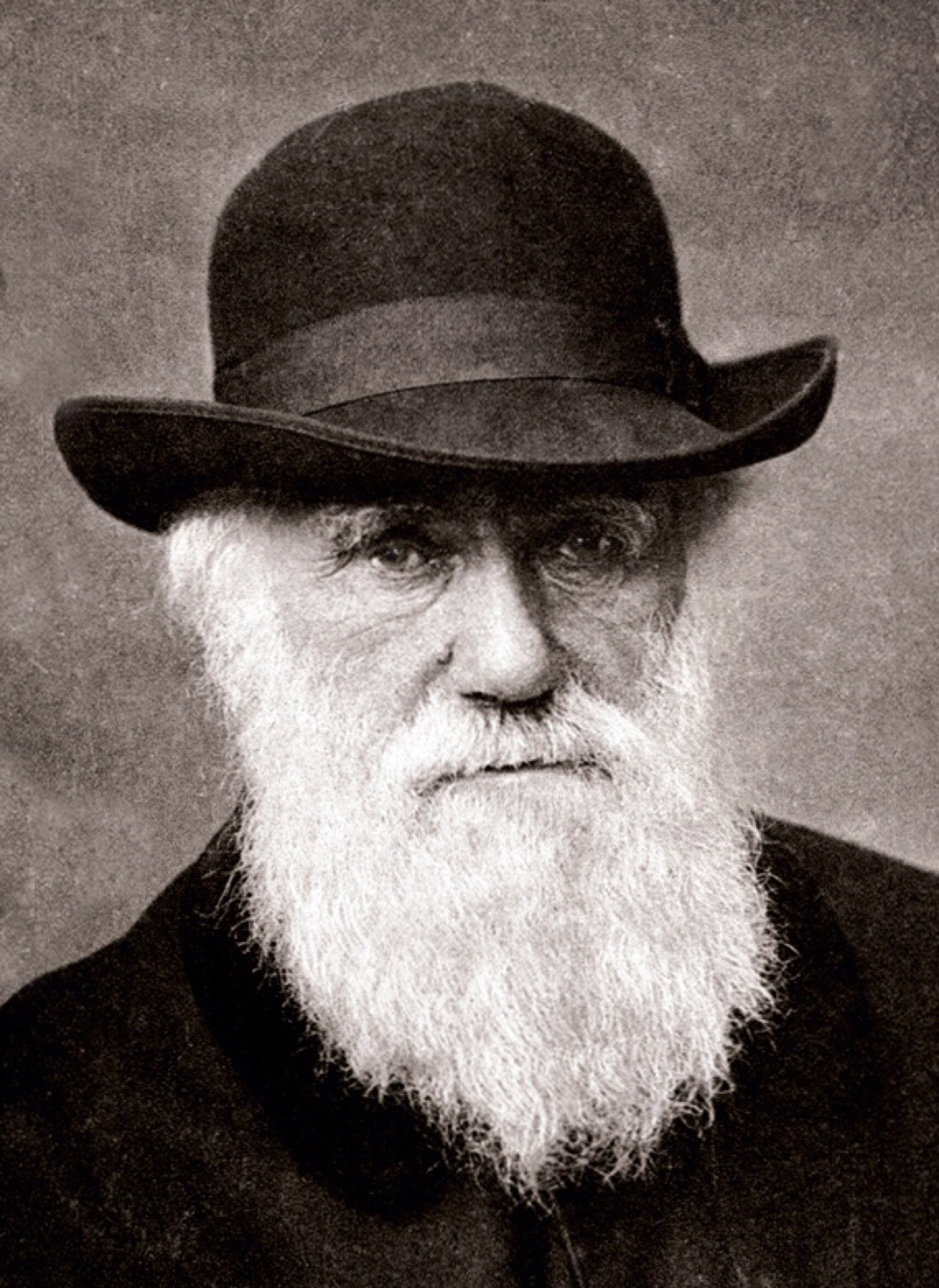
Charles Darwin, whose On the Origin of Species introduced the theory of evolution to society at large, photographed in 1881

Evolutionism is a term used (often derogatorily) to denote the theory of evolution. Its exact meaning has changed over time as the study of evolution has progressed. In the 19th century, it was used to describe the belief that organisms deliberately improved themselves through progressive inherited change (orthogenesis). The teleological belief went on to include cultural evolution and social evolution. In the 1970s, the term "Neo-Evolutionism" was used to describe the idea that "human beings sought to preserve a familiar style of life unless change was forced on them by factors that were beyond their control."

The term is most often used by creationists to describe adherence to the scientific consensus on evolution as equivalent to a secular religion. The term is very seldom used within the scientific community, since the scientific position on evolution is accepted by the overwhelming majority of scientists. Because evolutionary biology is the default scientific position, it is assumed that "scientists" or "biologists" are "evolutionists" unless specifically noted otherwise. In the creation–evolution controversy, creationists often call those who accept the validity of the modern evolutionary synthesis "evolutionists" and the theory itself "evolutionism".

== 19th-century teleological use ==
Before its use to describe biological evolution, the term "evolution" was originally used to refer to any orderly sequence of events with the outcome somehow contained at the start. The first five editions of Darwin's in Origin of Species used the word "evolved", but the word "evolution" was only used in its sixth edition in 1872. By then, Herbert Spencer had developed the concept theory that organisms strive to evolve due to an internal "driving force" (orthogenesis) in 1862. Edward B. Tylor and Lewis H Morgan brought the term "evolution" to anthropology though they tended toward the older pre-Spencerian definition helping to form the concept of unilineal (social) evolution used during the later part of what Trigger calls the Antiquarianism-Imperial Synthesis period (c1770-c1900). The term evolutionism subsequently came to be used for the now discredited theory that evolution contained a deliberate component, rather than the selection of beneficial traits from random variation by differential survival.

== Modern use by creationists ==
The term evolution is widely used, but the term evolutionism is not used in the scientific community to refer to evolutionary biology as it is redundant and anachronistic.

However, the term has been used by creationists in discussing the creation–evolution controversy. For example, the Institute for Creation Research, in order to imply placement of evolution in the category of 'religions', including atheism, fascism, humanism and occultism, commonly uses the words evolutionism and evolutionist to describe the consensus of mainstream science and the scientists subscribing to it, thus implying through language that the issue is a matter of religious belief. The BioLogos Foundation, an organization that promotes the idea of theistic evolution, uses the term "evolutionism" to describe "the atheistic worldview that so often accompanies the acceptance of biological evolution in public discourse." It views this as a subset of scientism.

== See also ==
- Alternatives to evolution by natural selection
- Darwinism
- Evolution as fact and theory
- Evidence of common descent
- Social Darwinism
