= Multilineal evolution =

Social theory

Multilineal evolution is a 20th-century social theory about the evolution of societies and cultures. It is composed of many competing theories by various sociologists and anthropologists. This theory has replaced the older 19th century set of theories of unilineal evolution, where evolutionists were deeply interested in making generalizations.

When critique of classical social evolutionism became widely accepted, modern anthropological and sociological approaches have changed to reflect their responses to the critique of their predecessor. Modern theories are careful to avoid unsourced, ethnocentric speculation, comparisons, or value judgements; more or less regarding individual societies as existing within their own historical contexts. These conditions provided the context for new theories such as cultural relativism and multilinear evolution, which criticizes the generalization of culture and hypothetical stages of evolution.

== History ==
Around 1940, a number of American anthropologists began rejecting the ideas of unilinear evolutionism and universal evolutionism, and began to move towards the idea of multilinear evolutionism. This theory focused around the process that culture moves forward down a number of paths consisting of different styles and lengths.

=== Approaches ===
By mid-twentieth century, anthropologists started to criticize the generalization of culture and the hypothetical stages of cultural evolution, and instead, started a new trend of viewing all cultures as unique according to time and place.

Leslie White rejected the opposition between "primitive" and "modern" societies but did argue that societies could be distinguished based on the amount of energy they harnessed, and that increased energy allowed for greater social differentiation. White thought in broad, universal schemes, while anthropologists such as Julian Steward preferred to use a more limited, multilinear strategy. Steward rejected the 19th century notion of progress, and instead called attention to the Darwinian notion of "adaptation," arguing that all societies had to adapt to their environment in some way, but that the process could differ between cultures. Julian Steward thus linked multilinear evolution with the idea of cultural ecology.

Anthropologists Marshall Sahlins and Elman Service wrote a book, Evolution and Culture, in which they attempted to synthesize White's and Steward's approaches. Sahlins and Service argue that societies develop through a process of specialized adaptions to their habitat and neighbouring societies, and that variations in environments and historical contacts are what leads to cultural diversification.

Cultural evolution had previously been treated much like biological evolution, but many anthropologists were quick to dismiss this comparison. Steward wrote that unlike biological evolution, in cultural evolution it is assumed that cultural patterns in different parts of the world are genetically unrelated, and yet they were said in unilinear evolution to pass through parallel sequences. Sahlins and Service also dismissed this comparison, stating that cultural variation could be transmitted between different lines by diffusion, where biological evolution cannot.

The multilineal evolutionary theory views the process of cultural development as an adaption to nature's resources through technological breakthroughs, as well as coping with outside cultural influence. Through this adaptation process, cultures form new traits called "inventions," and new items are made available from outside cultures through "diffusion." While each anthropologist's theory regarding multilineal evolution has varied slightly, most agreed that no specific evolutionary changes are experienced by all cultures universally, but that all human societies do generally evolve or progress.

Other anthropologists, such as Peter Vayda and Roy Rappaport, have gone on to build or respond to work done by White and Steward, such as developing theories of cultural ecology and ecological anthropology. By the late 1950s, students of Steward such as Eric Wolf and Sidney Mintz turned away from cultural ecology to Marxism, World Systems Theory, Dependency theory and Marvin Harris's cultural materialism.

=== Twenty-first Century ===
Today most anthropologists continue to reject 19th century notions of progress and the three original assumptions of unilineal evolution. Following Steward, they take seriously the relationship between a culture and its environment in attempts to explain different aspects of a culture. But most modern cultural anthropologists have adopted a general systems approach, examining cultures as emergent systems and argue that one must consider the whole social environment, which includes political and economic relations among cultures. There are still others who continue to reject the entirety of the evolutionary thinking and look instead at historical contingencies, contacts with other cultures, and the operation of cultural symbol systems. As a result, the simplistic notion of 'cultural evolution' has grown less useful and given way to an entire series of more nuanced approaches to the relationship of culture and environment. In the area of development studies, authors such as Amartya Sen have developed an understanding of 'development' and 'human flourishing' that also question more simplistic notions of progress, while retaining much of their original inspiration.

== See also ==
- Neoevolutionism
- Sociobiology
- Theory of modernisation
- Theory of post-industrial society
