= Stephen K. Sanderson =

American sociologist (born 1945)

Stephen K. Sanderson (born November 15, 1945) is an American sociologist. His area of focus includes comparative sociology, historical sociology, sociological theory and sociocultural evolution. He is a specialist in sociological theory and comparative and historical sociology and is one of the leading sociologists to develop an evolutionist, yet non-Darwinist, understanding of human society. He has written or edited ten books and about sixty peer-reviewed articles, and is the author of numerous articles and many books, including Evolutionism and Its Critics.

He was a professor of sociology at Indiana University of Pennsylvania. Since 2007 he has been a visiting scholar at the Institute for Research on World-Systems at the University of California, Riverside.

Sanderson received a PhD from the University of Nebraska–Lincoln in 1973.

== See also ==
- Robert L. Carneiro
