= Ecological-evolutionary theory =

Ecological-evolutionary theory (EET) is a sociological theory of sociocultural evolution that attempts to explain the origin and changes of society and culture. Key elements focus on the importance of natural environment and technological change. EET has been described as a theory of social stratification, as it analyzes how stratification has changed through time across different societies. It also has been viewed as a synthesis of the structural functionalism and conflict theory. Proposed by Gerhard Lenski, the theory perhaps is best articulated in his book, Ecological-Evolutionary Theory: Principles and Applications (2005). His major collaborators, Jean Lenski and Patrick Nolan, also are said to have contributed to EET.

== Theory ==
Lenski notes that society and culture evolve through symbols, which makes this process much more rapid, deliberative, and purposeful, compared to biological evolution. However, just like in the biological survival of the fittest, in sociocultural evolution there is a process of intersocietal selection, where less fit sociocultural systems became extinct, replaced by more efficient ones. In another analogy to biological evolution, Lenski argues that the sociocultural systems that survive do so primarily on the virtue of their level of technological advancement, which otherwise is "blind and purposeless as the outcome of the biological process of natural selection and just as indifferent to humans beliefs and values". Thus, Lenski does not argue that societies that survive are morally superior to those that are defeated—simply that they were more efficient at technological progress. This, in turn, helps those societies survive and grow. Technologies can thus be compared to genes of a society, providing it with new abilities, as new technologies allow it to do things that it could not have done before.

Technology is a factor whose importance Lenski stresses above all others, and he differentiates societies by their technology level, into hunter gatherers, simple and complex horticulture, agrarian societies and industrial societies. At the same time, characteristics of a society go beyond technology, into its demographic and genetic characteristics; culture, including material; social organization and institutions. Natural environment also plays a role, as does geographical location in general; as isolated societies have less chance to benefit from interaction with others.

Lenski's theory focus on material infrastructure of societies (growth in population and economic relations), and as such has been described as materialist. It builds on classic theories of Thomas Malthus and Herbert Spencer in seeing society and culture as products of nature (human beings), thus subject to natural law. Lenski argues that humans often act against the interests of the society, which he attributes to self-interest and individualism, themselves products of differing life experiences. He notes that different societies survive thanks to their subsistence strategies, which allow them to draw resources (energy) from the environment; those strategies are determined by technologies possessed by those societies, itself significantly determined by demography (population and its growth) and economy systems (division of labor). Technology, defined by him as "information about the ways in which resources in the environment may be used to satisfy human needs and desires," is the most important element of the sociocultural system.

Lenski further argues that sociocultural change is an effect of either interaction with a different society and culture, or a result of environment change (from natural ones, like ice ages, to man-made ones, like resource depletion). Humans primary way of dealing with changing environment is a self-reinforcing development of technology, through innovation is in general less common than copying solutions invented by others (cultural diffusion).

All societies share two partially competing goals: maximization of production and minimizing of political change (maintenance of powers by the elites). The higher the social stratification, the more dominant the second goal is. Lenski theory can be thus used to analyze the changes of social inequality. Lenski notes that some level of social inequality is expected in all societies, as it is related to differences in abilities of individuals and the tasks they chose to perform for the society; but he also observes that inequality in all societies has always been higher than ideal, as elites usually try to preserve their dominant status. Lenski argues that inequality reached its peak levels in agrarian societies or industrial ones, and have been slowly declining since.

Lenski observes that the forces of technological change (innovation) are in constant conflict with forces of continuity and stability, such as traditions, conservatism, opposition of vested interests to disruptive technologies, and general tendency of humans to resist change. He concludes, however, that usually technological progress overcomes any obstacles, forcing sociocultural systems to change. Lenski also observes that technological change accelerates over time.

The theory has been praised as "a synthesis of key insights of the founders of sociology and of contemporary macrosociology and anthropology".

== See also ==
- Neoevolutionism
