= Sociocultural evolution =

Evolution of societies

Sociocultural evolution, sociocultural evolutionism or social evolution are theories of cultural evolution that describe how societies and culture change over time. Whereas sociocultural development traces processes that tend to increase the complexity of a society or culture, sociocultural evolution also considers process that can lead to decreases in complexity (degeneration) or that can produce variation or proliferation without any seemingly significant changes in complexity (cladogenesis). Sociocultural evolution is "the process by which structural reorganization is affected through time, eventually producing a form or structure that is qualitatively different from the ancestral form".

Evolutionary sociology and biosociology are subfields of sociology. Evolutionary sociology refers to scholarship examining the interaction between human evolved traits and predispositions with social and material environments. Biosociology refers to scholarship examining the interaction between biomarkers (genes, hormones, polygenic scores, etc.) and social and material environments. This distinction roughly follows the classical distinction between “ultimate” and “proximate” causes. Ultimate or evolutionary causation focuses on the reasons a trait evolved and its adaptive functionality, and the role of evolved traits in social behavior is the focus of evolutionary sociology. Biosociology, by contrast, has a proximate focus, emphasizing mechanisms driving behaviors via hormonal, (epi-)genetic, neural, or other physiological pathways.

Most of the 19th-century and some 20th-century approaches to socioculture aimed to provide models for the evolution of humankind as a whole, arguing that different societies have reached different stages of social development. The most comprehensive attempt to develop a general theory of social evolution centering on the development of sociocultural systems, the work of Talcott Parsons (1902–1979), operated on a scale which included a theory of world history. Another attempt, on a less systematic scale, originated from the 1970s with the world-systems approach of Immanuel Wallerstein (1930–2019) and his followers.

More recent approaches focus on changes specific to individual societies and reject the idea that cultures differ primarily according to how far each one has moved along some presumed linear scale of social progress. Most modern archaeologists and cultural anthropologists work within the frameworks of neoevolutionism,and modernization theory, on one hand, and particularist approaches, on the other.

== Introduction ==
While the history of evolutionary thinking with regard to humans can be traced back at least to Aristotle and other Greek philosophers, early sociocultural-evolution theories – the ideas of Auguste Comte (1798–1857), Herbert Spencer (1820–1903) and Lewis Henry Morgan (1818–1881) – developed simultaneously with, but independently of, the work of Charles Darwin (1809–1882) and were popular from late in the 19th century to the end of World War I. The 19th-century unilineal evolution theories claimed that societies start out in a primitive state and gradually become more civilized over time; they equated the culture and technology of Western civilization with progress. Some forms of early sociocultural-evolution theories (mainly unilineal ones) have led to much-criticised theories like social Darwinism and scientific racism, sometimes used in the past by European imperial powers to justify existing policies of colonialism and slavery and to justify new policies such as eugenics.

Most 19th-century and some 20th-century approaches aimed to provide models for the evolution of humankind as a single entity. However, most 20th-century approaches, such as multilineal evolution, focused on changes specific to individual societies. Moreover, they rejected directional change (i.e. orthogenetic, teleological or progressive change). Most archaeologists work within the framework of multilineal evolution. Other contemporary approaches to social change include neoevolutionism, dual inheritance theory, modernisation theory and postindustrial theory.

In his seminal 1976 book The Selfish Gene, Richard Dawkins wrote that "there are some examples of cultural evolution in birds and monkeys, but ... it is our own species that really shows what cultural evolution can do".

== Stadial theory ==
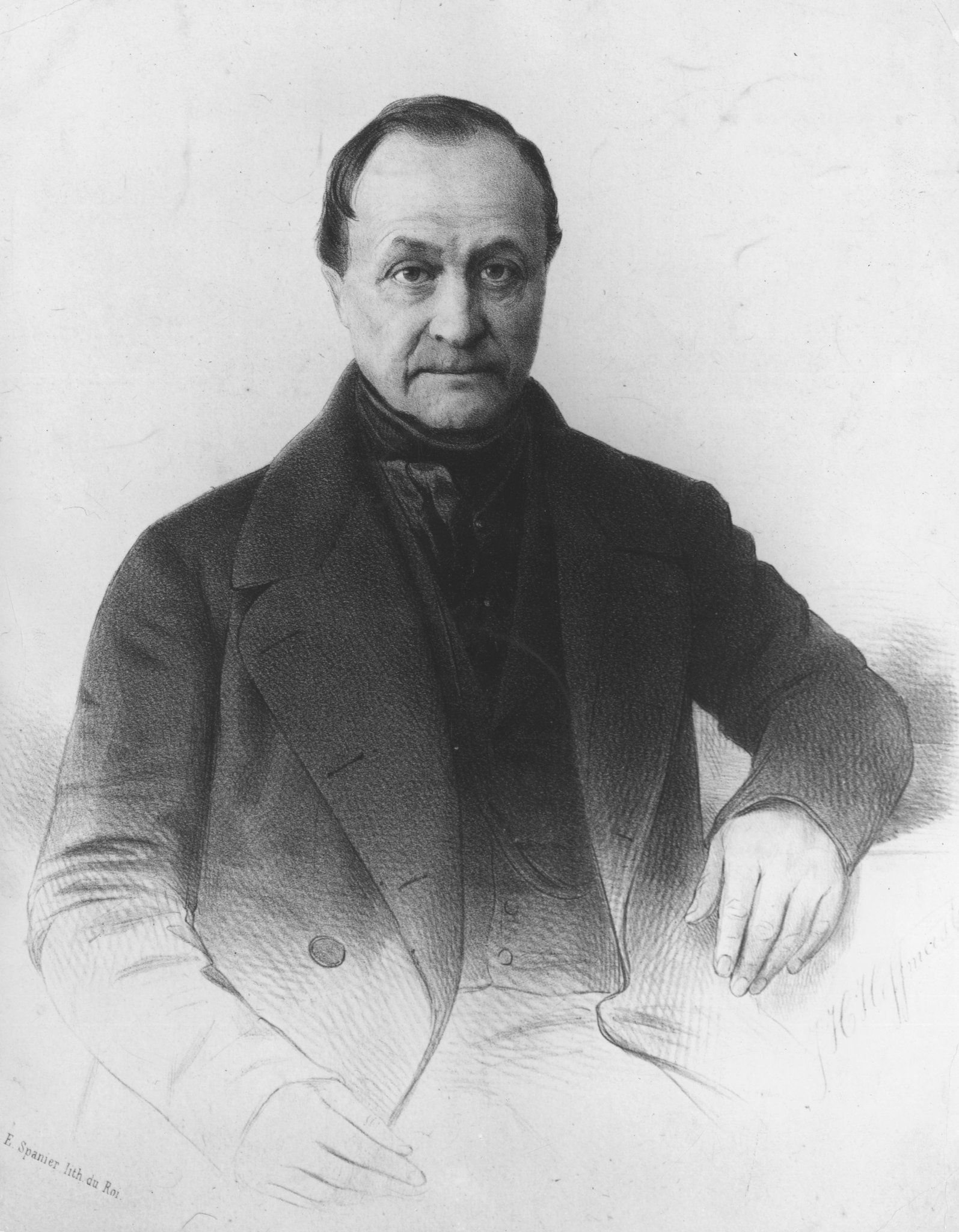
Auguste Comte (1798–1857)

Eventually, in the 19th century three major classical theories of social and historical change emerged:

- sociocultural evolutionism
- the social cycle theory
- the Marxist theory of historical materialism.

These theories had a common factor: they all agreed that the history of humanity is pursuing a certain fixed path, most likely that of social progress. Thus, each past event is not only chronologically, but causally tied to present and future events. The theories postulated that by recreating the sequence of those events, sociology could discover the "laws" of history.

=== Sociocultural evolutionism and the idea of progress ===
While sociocultural evolutionists agree that an evolution-like process leads to social progress, classical social evolutionists have developed many different theories, known as theories of unilineal evolution. Sociocultural evolutionism became the prevailing theory of early sociocultural anthropology and social commentary through the work of scholars like Auguste Comte (1798–1857), Edward Burnett Tylor (1832–1917), Lewis Henry Morgan (1818–1881), Benjamin Kidd (1858–1916), L. T. Hobhouse (1864–1929) and Herbert Spencer (1820–1903). Models incorporating distinct stages and ideas of linear models of progress not only had a great influence on future evolutionary approaches in the social sciences and humanities, but also shaped public, scholarly, and scientific discourse surrounding the rising individualism and "population thinking". Sociocultural evolutionism attempted to formalise social thinking along scientific lines, with the added influence from the biological theory of evolution. If organisms could develop over time according to discernible, deterministic laws, then it seemed reasonable that societies could as well. Human society was compared to a biological organism, and social-science equivalents of concepts like variation, natural selection, and inheritance were introduced as factors bearing on the progress of societies. The idea of "progress" led to that of a fixed "stages" through which human societies develop, usually numbering three – savagery, barbarism, and civilization – but sometimes many more. At that time, anthropology was rising as a new scientific discipline, separating itself from the traditional views of "primitive" cultures that were usually based on religious views.

Already in the 18th century, some authors began to theorize on the evolution of humans. Montesquieu (1689–1755) writes about the relationship laws have with climate in particular and with the environment in general, specifically how different climatic conditions cause certain characteristics to become common among different people. He likens the development of laws, the presence or absence of civil liberty, differences in morality, and the whole development of different cultures to the climate of the respective people, concluding that the environment determines whether and how a people farms the land, which determines the way their society is built and the way their culture is constituted, or, in Montesquieu's words, the "general spirit of a nation". Jean-Jacques Rousseau (1712–1778) presents a conjectural stage-model of human sociocultural evolution: first, humans lived solitarily and only grouped when mating or raising children. Later, men and women lived together and shared childcare, thus building families, followed by tribes as the result of inter-family interactions, which lived in "the happiest and the most lasting epoch" of human history, before the corruption of civil society degenerated the species - again in a developmental stage-process.

Erasmus Darwin (1731–1802), Charles Darwin's grandfather, was an enormously influential natural philosopher, physiologist and poet whose remarkably insightful ideas included a statement of transformism and the interconnectedness of all forms of life. His works, which are enormously wide-ranging, also advance a theory of cultural transformation: his famous The Temple of Nature is subtitled 'the Origin of Society'. This work, rather than proposing in detail a strict transformation of humanity between different stages, instead dwells on Erasmus Darwin's evolutionary mechanism: Erasmus Darwin does not explain each stage one-by-one, trusting his theory of universal organic development, as articulated in the Zoonomia, to illustrate cultural development as well. Erasmus Darwin therefore flits with abandon through his chronology: Priestman notes that it jumps from the emergence of life onto land, the development of opposable thumbs, and the origin of sexual reproduction directly to modern historical events.

Another more complex theorist was Richard Payne Knight (1751–1824), an influential amateur archeologist and universal theologian. Knight's The Progress of Civil Society: A Didactic Poem in Six Books (1796) fits precisely into the tradition of triumphant historical stages, beginning with Lucretius and reaching Adam Smith – but just for the first four books. In his final books, Knight then grapples with the French revolution and wealthy decadence. Confronted with these twin issues, Knight's theory ascribes progress to conflict: 'partial discord lends its aid, to tie the complex knots of general harmony'. Competition in Knight's mechanism spurs development from any one stage to the next: the dialectic of class, land and gender creates growth. Thus, Knight conceptualised a theory of history founded in inevitable racial conflict, with Greece representing 'freedom' and Egypt 'cold inactive stupor'.

Other than Erasmus Darwin, the other pre-eminent scientific text with a theory of cultural transformation was advanced by Robert Chambers (1802–1871). Chambers was a Scottish evolutionary thinker and philosopher who, though he was then and now perceived as scientifically inadequate and criticized by prominent contemporaries, is important because he was so widely read. There are records of everyone from Queen Victoria to individual dockworkers enjoying his Vestiges of the Natural History of Creation (1844), including future generations of scientists. That The Vestiges did not establish itself as the scientific cutting edge is precisely the point, since the Vestiges's influence means it was both the concept of evolution the Victorian public was most likely to experience, and the scientific presupposition laid earliest in the minds of bright young scholars.

Chambers propounded a 'principle of development' whereby everything evolved by the same mechanism and towards higher order structure or meaning. In his theory, life advanced through different 'classes', and within each class animals began at the lowest form and then advanced to more complex forms in the same class. In short, the progress of animals was like the development of a foetus. More than just an indistinct analogy, this parallel between embryology and species development had the status of a genuine causal mechanism in Chambers' theory: more advanced species developed longer as embryos into all their complexity.

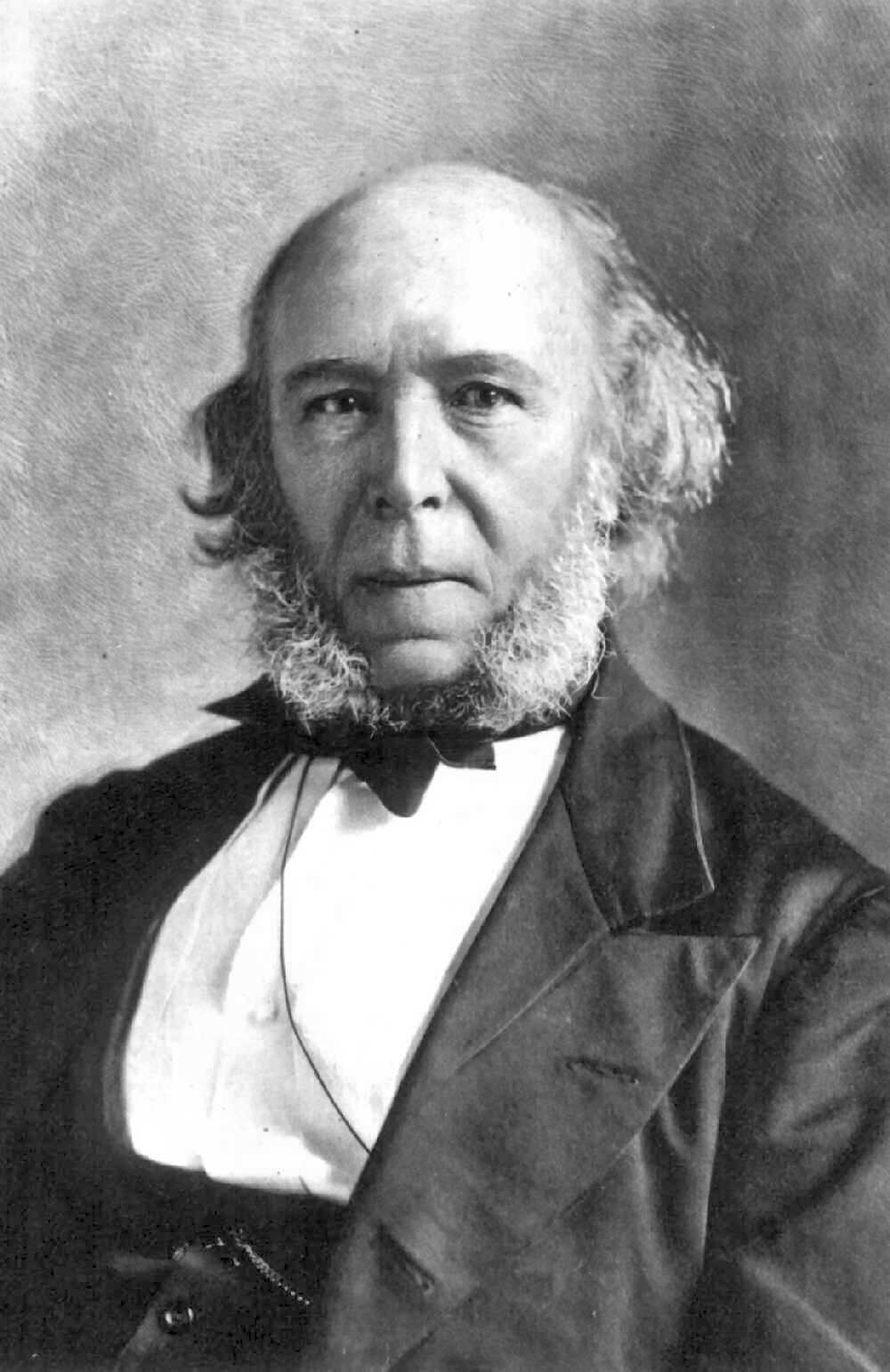
Herbert Spencer

In the mid-19th century, a "revolution in ideas about the antiquity of the human species" took place "which paralleled, but was to some extent independent of, the Darwinian revolution in biology." Especially in geology, archaeology, and anthropology, scholars began to compare "primitive" cultures to past societies and "saw their level of technology as parallel with that of Stone Age cultures, and thus used these peoples as models for the early stages of human evolution". A developmental model of the evolution of the mind, of culture, and of society was the result, paralleling the evolution of the human species: "Modern savages [sic] became, in effect, living fossils left behind by the march of progress, relics of the Paleolithic still lingering on into the present." Classical social evolutionism is most closely associated with the 19th-century writings of Auguste Comte and of Herbert Spencer (coiner of the phrase "survival of the fittest"). In many ways, Spencer's theory of "cosmic evolution" has much more in common with the works of Jean-Baptiste Lamarck (1744–1829) and of Auguste Comte than with contemporary works of Charles Darwin. Spencer also developed and published his theories several years earlier than Darwin. In regard to social institutions, however, there is a good case that Spencer's writings might be classified as discussing social evolutionism. Although he wrote that societies over time progressed – and that progress was accomplished through competition – he stressed that the individual rather than the collectivity is the unit of analysis that evolves; that, in other words, evolution takes place through natural selection and that it affects social as well as biological phenomenon. Nonetheless, the publication of Darwin's works proved a boon to the proponents of sociocultural evolution, who saw the ideas of biological evolution as an attractive explanation for many questions about the development of society.

Both Spencer and Comte view society as a kind of organism subject to the process of growth – from simplicity to complexity, from chaos to order, from generalisation to specialisation, from flexibility to organisation. They agree that the process of societal growth can be divided into certain stages, have their beginning and eventual end, and that this growth is in fact social progress: each newer, more-evolved society is "better". Thus progressivism became one of the basic ideas underlying the theory of sociocultural evolutionism.

However, Spencer's theories were more complex than just a romp up the great chain of being. Spencer based his arguments on an analogy between the evolution of societies and the ontogeny of an animal. Accordingly, he searched for "general principles of development and structure" or "fundamental principles of organization", rather than being content simply ascribing progress between social stages to the direct intervention of some beneficent deity. Moreover, he accepted that these conditions are "far less specific, far more modifiable, far more dependent on conditions that are variable": in short, that they are a messy biological process.

Though Spencer's theories transcended the label of 'stagism' and appreciate biological complexity, they still accepted a strongly fixed direction and morality to natural development. For Spencer, interference with the natural process of evolution was dangerous and had to be avoided at all costs. Such views were naturally coupled to the pressing political and economic questions of the time. Spencer clearly thought society's evolution brought about a racial hierarchy with Caucasians at the top and Africans at the bottom. This notion is deeply linked to the colonial projects European powers were pursuing at the time, and the idea of European superiority used paternalistically to justify those projects. The influential German zoologist Ernst Haeckel even wrote that 'natural men are closer to the higher vertebrates than highly civilized Europeans', including not just a racial hierarchy but a civilizational one. Likewise, Spencer's evolutionary argument advanced a theory of statehood: "until spontaneously fulfilled a public want should not be fulfilled at all" sums up Spencer's notion about limited government and the free operation of market forces.

This is not to suggest that stagism was useless or entirely motivated by colonialism and racism. Stagist theories were first proposed in contexts where competing epistemologies were largely static views of the world. Hence "progress" had in some sense to be invented, conceptually: the idea that human society would move through stages was a triumphant invention. Moreover, stages were not always static entities. In Buffon's theories, for example, it was possible to regress between stages, and physiological changes were species' reversibly adapting to their environment rather than irreversibly transforming.

In addition to progressivism, economic analyses influenced classical social evolutionism. Adam Smith (1723–1790), who held a deeply evolutionary view of human society, identified the growth of freedom as the driving force in a process of stadial societal development. According to him, all societies pass successively through four stages: the earliest humans lived as hunter-gatherers, followed by pastoralists and nomads, after which society evolved to agriculturalists and ultimately reached the stage of commerce. With the strong emphasis on specialisation and the increased profits stemming from a division of labour, Smith's thinking also exerted some direct influence on Darwin himself. Both in Darwin's theory of the evolution of species and in Smith's accounts of political economy, competition between selfishly functioning units plays an important and even dominating rôle. Similarly occupied with economic concerns as Smith, Thomas R. Malthus (1766–1834) warned that given the strength of the sex drive inherent in all animals, Malthus argued, populations tend to grow geometrically, and population growth is only checked by the limitations of economic growth, which, if there would be growth at all, would quickly be outstripped by population growth, causing hunger, poverty, and misery. Far from being the consequences of economic structures or social orders, this "struggle for existence" is an inevitable natural law, so Malthus.

Auguste Comte, known as "the father of sociology", formulated the law of three stages: human development progresses from the theological stage, in which nature was mythically conceived and man sought the explanation of natural phenomena from supernatural beings; through a metaphysical stage in which nature was conceived of as a result of obscure forces and man sought the explanation of natural phenomena from them; until the final positive stage in which all abstract and obscure forces are discarded, and natural phenomena are explained by their constant relationship. This progress is forced through the development of human mind, and through increasing application of thought, reasoning and logic to the understanding of the world. Comte saw the science-valuing society as the highest, most developed type of human organization.

Herbert Spencer, who argued against government intervention as he believed that society should evolve toward more individual freedom, followed Lamarck in his evolutionary thinking, in that he believed that humans do over time adapt to their surroundings. He differentiated between two phases of development as regards societies' internal regulation: the "military" and "industrial" societies. The earlier (and more primitive) military society has the goal of conquest and defense, is centralised, economically self-sufficient, collectivistic, puts the good of a group over the good of an individual, uses compulsion, force and repression, and rewards loyalty, obedience and discipline. The industrial society, in contrast, has a goal of production and trade, is decentralised, interconnected with other societies via economic relations, works through voluntary cooperation and individual self-restraint, treats the good of individual as of the highest value, regulates the social life via voluntary relations; and values initiative, independence and innovation. The transition process from the military to industrial society is the outcome of steady evolutionary processes within the society. Spencer "imagined a kind of feedback loop between mental and social evolution: the higher the mental powers the greater the complexity of the society that the individuals could create; the more complex the society, the greater the stimulus it provided for further mental development. Everything cohered to make progress inevitable or to weed out those who did not keep up."

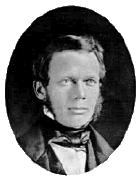
Lewis H. Morgan

In his 1877 classic Ancient Societies, Lewis H. Morgan, an anthropologist whose ideas have had much impact on sociology, differentiated between three eras: savagery, barbarism and civilization, which are divided by technological inventions, like fire, bow, pottery in the savage era, domestication of animals, agriculture, metalworking in the barbarian era and alphabet and writing in the civilization era. Thus Morgan drew a link between social progress and technological progress. Morgan viewed technological progress as a force behind social progress, and held that any social change – in social institutions, organizations or ideologies – has its beginnings in technological change. Morgan's theories were popularized by Friedrich Engels, who based his famous work The Origin of the Family, Private Property and the State on them. For Engels and other Marxists this theory was important, as it supported their conviction that materialistic factors – economic and technological – are decisive in shaping the fate of humanity.

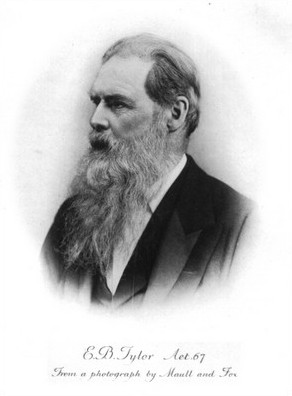
Edward Burnett Tylor

Their analysis of cross-cultural data was based on three assumptions:

1. contemporary societies may be classified and ranked as more "primitive" or more "civilized"
2. there are a determinate number of stages between "primitive" and "civilized" (e.g. band, tribe, chiefdom, and state)
3. all societies progress through these stages in the same sequence, but at different rates

Theorists usually measured progression (that is, the difference between one stage and the next) in terms of increasing social complexity (including class differentiation and a complex division of labour), or an increase in intellectual, theological, and aesthetic sophistication. These 19th-century ethnologists used these principles primarily to explain differences in religious beliefs and kinship terminologies among various societies.

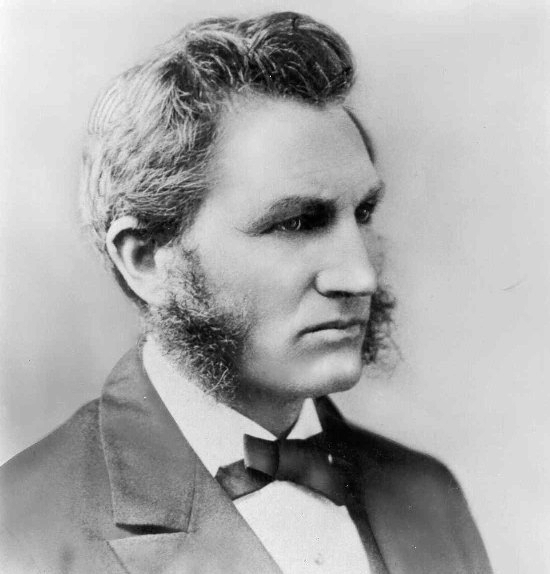
Lester Frank Ward

Lester Frank Ward (1841–1913), sometimes referred to as the "father" of American sociology, rejected many of Spencer's theories regarding the evolution of societies. Ward, who was also a botanist and a paleontologist, believed that the law of evolution functioned much differently in human societies than it did in the plant and animal kingdoms, and theorized that the "law of nature" had been superseded by the "law of the mind". He stressed that humans, driven by emotions, create goals for themselves and strive to realize them (most effectively with the modern scientific method) whereas there is no such intelligence and awareness guiding the non-human world. Plants and animals adapt to nature; man shapes nature. While Spencer believed that competition and "survival of the fittest" benefited human society and sociocultural evolution, Ward regarded competition as a destructive force, pointing out that all human institutions, traditions and laws were tools invented by the mind of man and that that mind designed them, like all tools, to "meet and checkmate" the unrestrained competition of natural forces. Ward agreed with Spencer that authoritarian governments repress the talents of the individual, but he believed that modern democratic societies, which minimized the role of religion and maximized that of science, could effectively support the individual in his or her attempt to fully utilize their talents and achieve happiness. He believed that the evolutionary processes have four stages:

- First comes cosmogenesis, creation and evolution of the world.
- Then, when life arises, there is biogenesis.
- Development of humanity leads to anthropogenesis, which is influenced by the human mind.
- Finally there arrives sociogenesis, which is the science of shaping the evolutionary process itself to optimize progress, human happiness and individual self-actualization.

Ward regarded modern societies as superior to "primitive" societies (one need only look to the impact of medical science on health and lifespan) and shared theories of white supremacy. Though he supported the Out-of-Africa theory of human evolution, he did not believe that all races and social classes were equal in talent. When a Negro rapes a white woman, Ward declared, he is impelled not only by lust but also by the instinctive drive to improve his own race. Ward did not think that evolutionary progress was inevitable and he feared the degeneration of societies and cultures, which he saw as very evident in the historical record. Ward also did not favor the radical reshaping of society as proposed by the supporters of the eugenics movement or by the followers of Karl Marx; like Comte, Ward believed that sociology was the most complex of the sciences and that true sociogenesis was impossible without considerable research and experimentation.

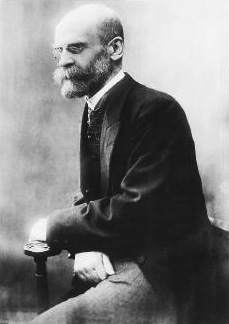
Émile Durkheim

Émile Durkheim, another of the "fathers" of sociology, developed a dichotomal view of social progress. His key concept was social solidarity, as he defined social evolution in terms of progressing from mechanical solidarity to organic solidarity. In mechanical solidarity, people are self-sufficient, there is little integration and thus there is the need for the use of force and repression to keep society together. In organic solidarity, people are much more integrated and interdependent and specialisation and cooperation are extensive. Progress from mechanical to organic solidarity is based firstly on population growth and increasing population density, secondly on increasing "morality density" (development of more complex social interactions) and thirdly on increasing specialisation in the workplace.

Ferdinand Tönnies (1855–1936) describes evolution as the development from informal society (where people have many liberties and there are few laws and obligations) to modern, formal rational society (dominated by traditions and laws, where people are restricted from acting as they wish). He also notes that there is a tendency to standardisation and unification when smaller societies are absorbed into a single, large, modern society. Thus Tönnies can be said to describe part of the process known today as globalization. Tönnies was also one of the first sociologists to claim that the evolution of society is not necessarily going in the right direction, that social progress is not perfect, and it can even be called a regression as the newer, more evolved societies are obtained only after paying a high cost, resulting in decreasing satisfaction of the individuals making up that society. Tönnies' work became the foundation of neoevolutionism.

=== Critique and impact on modern theories ===
However, the school of Boas ignore some of the complexity in evolutionary theories that emerged outside Herbert Spencer's influence. Charles Darwin's On the Origin of Species gave a mechanistic account of the origins and development of animals, quite apart from Spencer's theories that emphasized the inevitable human development through stages. Consequently, many scholars developed more sophisticated understandings of how cultures evolve, relying on deep cultural analogies, than the theories in Herbert Spencer's tradition. Walter Bagehot (1872) applied selection and inheritance to the development of human political institutions. Samuel Alexander (1892) discusses the natural selection of moral principles in society. William James (1880) considered the 'natural selection' of ideas in learning and scientific development. In fact, he identified a 'remarkable parallel [...] between the facts of social evolution on the one hand, and of zoological evolution as expounded by Mr Darwin on the other'. Charles Sanders Peirce (1898) proposed that the current laws of nature we have exist because they have evolved over time. Darwin himself, in Chapter 5 of The Descent of Man, proposed that human moral sentiments were subject to group selection: "A tribe including many members who, from possessing in a high degree the spirit of patriotism, fidelity, obedience, courage, and sympathy, were always ready to aid one another, and to sacrifice themselves for the common good, would be victorious over most other tribes; and this would be natural selection."

While these theories involved evolution applied to social questions, except for Darwin's group selection the theories reviewed above did not advance a precise understanding of how Darwin's mechanism extended and applied to cultures beyond a vague appeal to competition. David George Ritchie's Darwinism and Politics (1889) breaks this trend, holding that "language and social institutions make it possible to transmit experience quite independently of the continuity of race." Hence Ritchie saw cultural evolution as a process that could operate independently of and on different scales to the evolution of species, and gave it precise underpinnings: he was 'extending its range', in his own words, to ideas, cultures and institutions.

Thorstein Veblen, around the same time, came to a similar insight: that humans evolve to their social environment, but their social environment in turn also evolves. Veblen's mechanism for human progress was the evolution of human intentionality: Veblen labelled men 'a creature of habit' and thought that habits were 'mentally digested' from those who influenced him. In short, as Hodgson and Knudsen point out, Veblen thinks: "the changing institutions in their turn make for a further selection of individuals endowed with the fittest temperament, and a further adaptation of individual temperament and habits to the changing environment through the formation of new institutions." Thus, Veblen represented an extension of Ritchie's theories, where evolution operates at multiple levels, to a sophisticated appreciation of how each level interacts with the other.

=== Max Weber, disenchantment, and critical theory ===
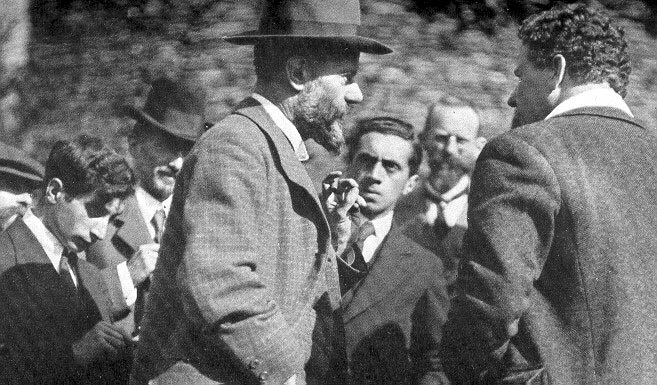
Max Weber in 1917

Weber's major works in economic sociology and the sociology of religion dealt with the rationalization, secularisation, and so called "disenchantment" which he associated with the rise of capitalism and modernity.

== Edward Westermarck and the beginnings of evolutionary sociology and biosociology ==
Early sociologists such as Marx, Spencer, Sumner, Weber, and Westermarck applied evolutionary concepts to theories of human social behavior. Theories such as those of Spencer selectively interpreted Darwin's ideas for theories of how societies change through sociocultural evolution. Central to many theories of sociocultural evolution is the analogy of society as a living organism, and processes of social change as analogous to biological evolution. While Durkheim largely rejected explanations involving biology or psychology, the analogy of society as an organism persisted metaphorically in functionalist theories.

Of these early sociologists, Finnish sociologist Edvard Westermarck (1862–1939) was the first to examine how evolved traits interacted with social and material settings to shape social behavior, earning him recognition as the “father” of evolutionary sociology and biosociology. Although he was much influenced by Darwinian ideas, he rejected the analogy of society to an organism and was primarily concerned with how the evolved traits of humans in interaction with other factors influenced aggregate social phenomena. He is best known for the Westermarck effect, the finding that children raised together tend not to find each other sexually attractive as adults. Influenced by Hume, Smith, and Darwin, Westermarck also worked under Alfred Russel Wallace, who wrote the introduction to his The History of Human Marriage.

Westermarck emphasized the interaction between evolved predispositions and social contexts. Moral emotions, shaped by evolution, were expressed as norms through social learning and contextual factors.

Unlike other social theorists influenced by Darwinian ideas, Westermarck was not concerned with sociocultural evolution at the aggregate level and rejected "group selection" theories of social behavior. He thought that evolved traits that supported social processes evolved primarily because of the adaptive benefits they offered to the individual. Despite early success, Westermarck's influence declined by the late 1920s, as sociologists largely rejected biological explanations, influenced by Durkheimian functionalism, the rise of behaviorism, and the association of evolution with eugenics and social Darwinism.

=== The sociobiology debate ===
Edward O. Wilson’s 1975 publication Sociobiology: A New Synthesis aimed to establish a discipline integrating biological insights to explain human and non-human social behavior. Sociobiology introduced concepts such as inclusive fitness and a gene-centered view of evolution.

In sociology, Pierre van den Berghe applied evolutionary perspectives to family and ethnic group structures. Another prominent sociologist who utilized evolutionary ideas at this time was Joseph Lopreato. While the sociobiology movement revived interest in biological explanations, it was met with widespread criticism in sociology, often politically and ideologically motivated.

Despite limited acceptance, the sociobiology debate highlighted the potential for interdisciplinary engagement between biology and sociology.

== Modern theories ==
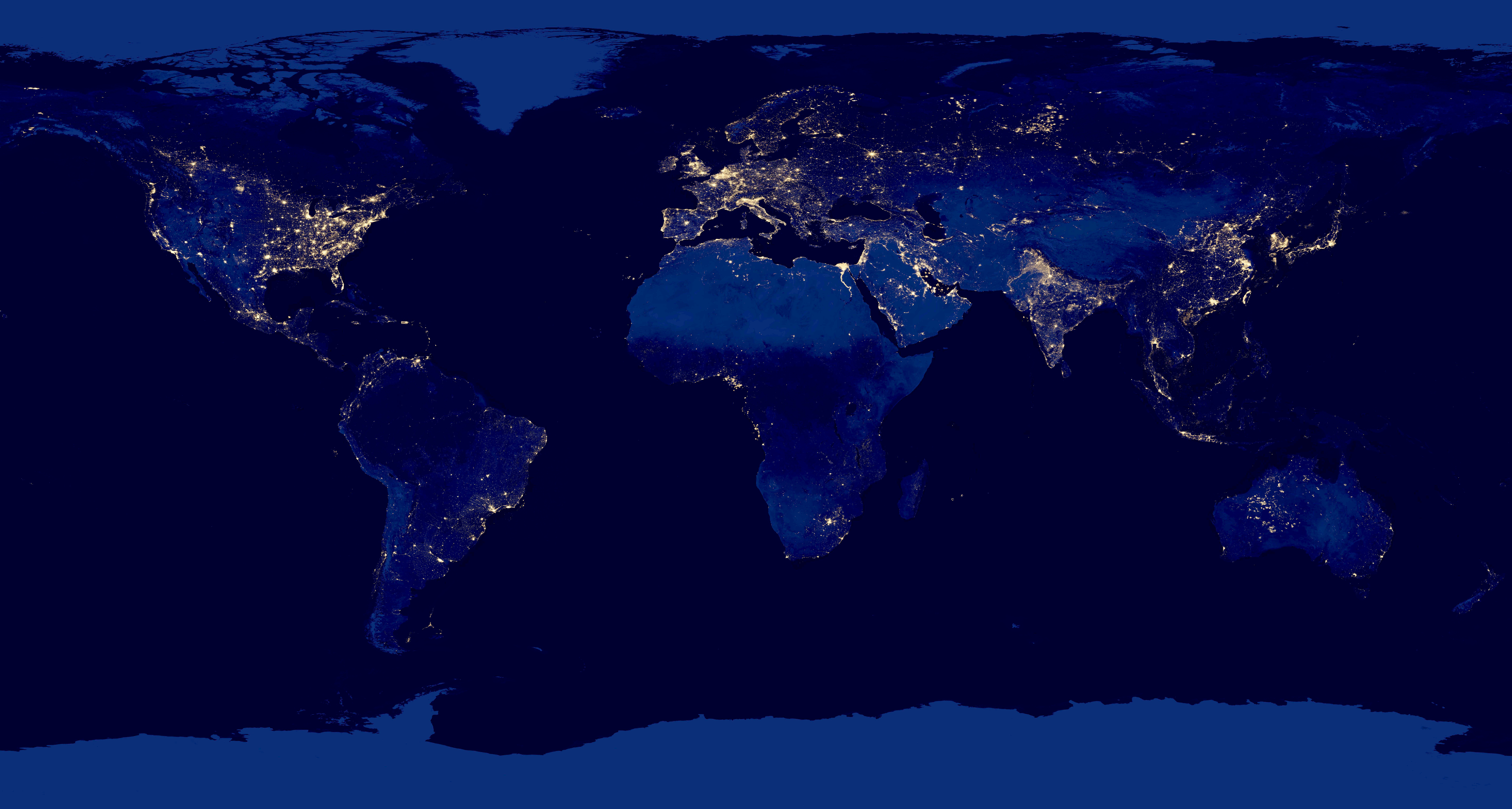
Composite image of the Earth at night in 2012, created by NASA and NOAA. The brightest areas of the Earth are the most urbanized, but not necessarily the most populated. Even more than 100 years after the invention of the electric light, most regions remain thinly populated or unlit.

In the 1920s and 1930s, Gordon Childe revolutionized the study of cultural evolutionism. He conducted a comprehensive pre-history account that provided scholars with evidence for African and Asian cultural transmission into Europe. He combated scientific racism by finding the tools and artifacts of the indigenous people from Africa and Asia and showed how they influenced the technology of European culture. Evidence from his excavations countered the idea of Aryan supremacy and superiority. Adopting "Kosinna's basic concept of the archaeological culture and his identification of such cultures as the remains of prehistoric peoples" and combining it with the detailed chronologies of European prehistory developed by Gustaf Oscar Montelius, Childe argued that each society needed to be delineated individually on the basis of constituent artefacts which were indicative of their practical and social function.

The anthropologists Marshall Sahlins and Elman Service prepared an edited volume, Evolution and Culture, in which they attempted to synthesise White's and Steward's approaches.

=== Neoevolutionism ===
Neoevolutionism was the first in a series of modern multilineal evolution theories. It emerged in the 1930s and extensively developed in the period following the Second World War and was incorporated into both anthropology and sociology in the 1960s. It bases its theories on empirical evidence from areas of archaeology, palaeontology, and historiography and tries to eliminate any references to systems of values, be it moral or cultural, instead trying to remain objective and simply descriptive.

Neo-evolutionism discards many ideas of classical social evolutionism, namely that of social progress, so dominant in previous sociology evolution-related theories. Then neo-evolutionism discards the determinism argument and introduces probability, arguing that accidents and free will greatly affect the process of social evolution.

Leslie White, author of The Evolution of Culture: The Development of Civilization to the Fall of Rome (1959), attempted to create a theory explaining the entire history of humanity. The most important factor in his theory is technology. Social systems are determined by technological systems, wrote White in his book, echoing the earlier theory of Lewis Henry Morgan. He proposes a society's energy consumption as a measure of its advancement. He differentiates between five stages of human development. In the first, people use the energy of their own muscles. In the second, they use the energy of domesticated animals. In the third, they use the energy of plants (so White refers to agricultural revolution here). In the fourth, they learn to use the energy of natural resources: coal, oil, gas. In the fifth, they harness nuclear energy. White introduced a formula, P=E·T, where E is a measure of energy consumed, and T is the measure of efficiency of technical factors utilising the energy.

Marshall Sahlins, co-editor with Elman Service of Evolution and Culture (1960), divided the evolution of societies into 'general' and 'specific'. General evolution is the tendency of cultural and social systems to increase in complexity, organization and adaptiveness to environment. However, as the various cultures are not isolated, there is interaction and a diffusion of their qualities (like technological inventions). This leads cultures to develop in different ways (specific evolution), as various elements are introduced to them in different combinations and at different stages of evolution.

In his Power and Prestige (1966) and Human Societies: An Introduction to Macrosociology (1974), Gerhard Lenski expands on the works of Leslie White and Lewis Henry Morgan, developing the ecological-evolutionary theory. He views technological progress as the most basic factor in the evolution of societies and cultures. Unlike White, who defined technology as the ability to create and utilise energy, Lenski focuses on information – its amount and uses. The more information and knowledge (especially allowing the shaping of natural environment) a given society has, the more advanced it is. He distinguishes four stages of human development, based on advances in the history of communication. In the first stage, information is passed by genes. In the second, when humans gain sentience, they can learn and pass information through by experience. In the third, humans start using signs and develop logic. In the fourth, they can create symbols and develop language and writing. Advancements in the technology of communication translate into advancements in the economic system and political system, distribution of goods, social inequality and other spheres of social life. He also differentiates societies based on their level of technology, communication and economy: (1) hunters and gatherers, (2) agricultural, (3) industrial, and (4) special (like fishing societies).

Talcott Parsons, author of Societies: Evolutionary and Comparative Perspectives (1966) and The System of Modern Societies (1971) divided evolution into four subprocesses: (1) division, which creates functional subsystems from the main system; (2) adaptation, where those systems evolve into more efficient versions; (3) inclusion of elements previously excluded from the given systems; and (4) generalization of values, increasing the legitimization of the ever more complex system.

Michel Foucault's recent, and very much misunderstood, concepts such as biopower, biopolitics and power-knowledge has been cited as breaking free from the traditional conception of man as cultural animal. Foucault regards both the terms "cultural animal" and "human nature"as misleading abstractions, leading to a non-critical exemption of man and anything can be justified when regarding social processes or natural phenomena (social phenomena). Foucault argues these complex processes are interrelated, and difficult to study for a reason so those 'truths' cannot be toppled or disrupted. For Foucault, the many modern concepts and practices that attempt to uncover "the truth" about human beings (either psychologically, sexually, religiously or spiritually) actually create the very types of people they purport to discover. Requiring trained "specialists" and knowledge codes and know how, rigorous pursuit is "put off" or delayed which makes any kind of study not only a 'taboo' subject but deliberately ignored. He cites the concept of 'truth' within many human cultures and the ever flowing dynamics between truth, power, and knowledge as a resultant complex dynamics (Foucault uses the term regimes of truth) and how they flow with ease like water which make the concept of 'truth' impervious to any further rational investigation. Some of the West's most powerful social institutions are powerful for a reason, not because they exhibit powerful structures which inhibit investigation or it is illegal to investigate their historical foundation. It is the very notion of "legitimacy" Foucault cites as examples of "truth" which function as a "Foundationalism" claims to historical accuracy. Foucault argues, systems such as medicine, prisons, and religion, as well as groundbreaking works on more abstract theoretical issues of power are suspended or buried into oblivion. He cites as further examples the 'Scientific study' of population biology and population genetics as both examples of this kind of "Biopower" over the vast majority of the human population giving the new founded political population their 'politics' or polity. With the advent of biology and genetics teamed together as new scientific innovations notions of study of knowledge regarding truth belong to the realm of experts who will never divulge their secrets openly, while the bulk of the population do not know their own biology or genetics this is done for them by the experts. This functions as a truth ignorance mechanism: "where the "subjugated knowledge's", as those that have been both written out of history and submerged in it in a masked form produces what we now know as truth. He calls them "Knowledge's from below" and a "historical knowledge of struggles". Genealogy, Foucault suggests, is a way of getting at these knowledge's and struggles; "they are about the insurrection of knowledge's." Foucault tries to show with the added dimension of "Milieu" (derived from Newtonian mechanics) how this Milieu from the 17th century with the development of the biological and physical sciences managed to be interwoven into the political, social and biological relationship of men with the arrival of the concept Work placed upon the industrial population. Foucault uses the term Umwelt, borrowed from Jakob von Uexküll, meaning environment within. Technology, production, cartography the production of nation states and government making the efficiency of the body politic, law, heredity and consanguinegeniune.

Foucault argues that the conceptual meaning from the Middle Ages and Canon law period, the Geocentric model, later superseded by the Heliocentrism model placing the position of the law of right in the Middle Ages (exclusive right or its correct legal term Sui generis) was the divine right of kings and absolute monarchy where the previous incarnation of truth and rule of political sovereignty was considered absolute and unquestioned by political philosophy (monarchs, popes and emperors). However, Foucault noticed that this Pharaonic version of political power was transversed and it was with 18th-century emergence of capitalism and liberal democracy that these terms began to be "democratized". The modern Pharaonic version represented by the president, the monarch, the pope and the prime minister all became propagandized versions or examples of symbol agents all aimed at towards a newly discovered phenomenon, the population. As symbolic symbol agents of power making the mass population having to sacrifice itself all in the name of the newly formed voting franchise we now call Democracy. However, this was all turned on its head (when the Medieval rulers were thrown out and replaced by a more exact apparatus now called the state) when the human sciences suddenly discovered: "The set of mechanisms through which the basic biological features of the human species became an object of a political strategy and took on board the fundamental facts that humans were now a biological species."

=== Sociobiology ===
Sociobiology departs perhaps the furthest from classical social evolutionism. It was introduced by Edward Wilson in his 1975 book Sociobiology: The New Synthesis and followed his adaptation of evolutionary theory to the field of social sciences. Wilson pioneered the attempt to explain the evolutionary mechanics behind social behaviours such as altruism, aggression, and nurturance. In doing so, Wilson sparked one of the greatest scientific controversies of the 20th century by introducing and rejuvenating neo-Darwinian modes of thinking in many social sciences and the humanities, leading to reactions ranging from fundamental opposition, not only from social scientists and humanists but also from Darwinists who see it as "excessively simplistic in its approach", to calls for a radical restructuring of the respective disciplines on an evolutionary basis.

The current theory of evolution, the modern evolutionary synthesis (or neo-darwinism), explains that evolution of species occurs through a combination of Darwin's mechanism of natural selection and Gregor Mendel's theory of genetics as the basis for biological inheritance and mathematical population genetics. Essentially, the modern synthesis introduced the connection between two important discoveries; the units of evolution (genes) with the main mechanism of evolution (selection).

Sociobiology has remained highly controversial as it contends genes explain specific human behaviours, although sociobiologists describe this role as a very complex and often unpredictable interaction between nature and nurture. The most notable critics of the view that genes play a direct role in human behaviour have been biologists Richard Lewontin, Steven Rose, and Stephen Jay Gould. Given the convergence of much of sociobiology's claims with right-wing politics, this approach has seen severe opposition both with regard to its research results as well as its basic tenets; this has led even Wilson himself to revisit his claims and state his opposition to some elements of modern sociobiology.

=== Dual inheritance theory ===
Since the rise of evolutionary psychology, another school of thought, Dual Inheritance Theory, has emerged in the past 25 years that applies the mathematical standards of Population genetics to modeling the adaptive and selective principles of culture. This school of thought was pioneered by Robert Boyd at UCLA and Peter Richerson at UC Davis and expanded by William Wimsatt, among others. Boyd and Richerson's book, Culture and the Evolutionary Process (1985), was a highly mathematical description of cultural change, later published in a more accessible form in Not by Genes Alone (2004). In Boyd and Richerson's view, cultural evolution, operating on socially learned information, exists on a separate but co-evolutionary track from genetic evolution, and while the two are related, cultural evolution is more dynamic, rapid, and influential on human society than genetic evolution:

"...we can adapt to a very wide range of environments, and other animals can't, because cultural evolution gives rise to the gradual accumulation of locally adaptive knowledge at a much faster rate than genetic evolution. A [prehistoric] human population entering a new environment can acquire the necessary knowledge, tools and social organization in centuries, not tens of thousands of years."

Dual Inheritance Theory has the benefit of providing unifying territory for a "nature and nurture" paradigm and accounts for more accurate phenomenon in evolutionary theory applied to culture, such as randomness effects (drift), concentration dependency, "fidelity" of evolving information systems, and lateral transmission through communication. Nicholas Christakis also advances similar ideas about "evolutionary sociology" in his 2019 book, Blueprint: The Evolutionary Origins of a Good Society, emphasizing the relevance of underlying evolutionary forces that have helped to shape all societies, whatever their cultural differences.

=== Theory of modernization ===
Theories of modernization are closely related to the dependency theory and development theory. While they have been developed and popularized in the 1950s and 1960s, their ideological and epistemic ancestors can be traced back until at least the early 20th century when progressivist historians and social scientists, building upon Darwinian ideas that the roots of economic success in the US had to be found in its population structure, which, as an immigrant society, was composed of the strongest and fittest individuals of their respective countries of origin, had started to supply the national myth of US-American manifest destiny with evolutionary reasoning. Explicitly and implicitly, the US became the yardstick of modernisation, and other societies could be measured in the extent of their modernity by how closely they adhered to the US-American example. Modernization Theories combine the previous theories of sociocultural evolution with practical experiences and empirical research, especially those from the era of decolonization. The theory states that:

- Western countries are the most developed, and the rest of the world (mostly former colonies) is in the earlier stages of development, and will eventually reach the same level as the Western world.
- Development stages go from the traditional societies to developed ones.
- Third World countries have fallen behind with their social progress and need to be directed on their way to becoming more advanced.

Developing from classical social evolutionism theories, the theory of modernization stresses the modernization factor: many societies are simply trying (or need) to emulate the most successful societies and cultures. It also states that it is possible to do so, thus supporting the concepts of social engineering and that the developed countries can and should help those less developed, directly or indirectly.

Among the scientists who contributed much to this theory are Walt Rostow, who in his The Stages of Economic Growth: A Non-Communist Manifesto (1960) concentrates on the economic system side of the modernization, trying to show factors needed for a country to reach the path to modernization in his Rostovian take-off model. David Apter concentrated on the political system and history of democracy, researching the connection between democracy, good governance and efficiency and modernization. David McClelland (The Achieving Society, 1967) approached this subject from the psychological perspective, with his motivations theory, arguing that modernization cannot happen until given society values innovation, success and free enterprise. Alex Inkeles (Becoming Modern, 1974) similarly creates a model of modern personality, which needs to be independent, active, interested in public policies and cultural matters, open to new experiences, rational and able to create long-term plans for the future.

== Contemporary perspectives ==
By the early 2000s, advances in genomics, neuroscience, and behavioral sciences fostered renewed interest in evolutionary sociology and biosociology. Proximate studies in behavioral neuroscience, endocrinology, and genetics highlighted the interplay between biological and social processes.

Key developments in sociology included Jeremy Freese et al., advocating incorporating biology into sociological research. Subsequent contributions focused on biosocial influences on families. Journals such as Social Forces and American Journal of Sociology published special issues on biosociology, signaling its institutionalization. In 2004 an Evolution and Sociology section of the American Sociological Association was established, now renamed Biology and Society.

Important scholars in the field include Jonathan H. Turner and Alexandra Maryanski, who linked human emotions and social attachments to evolutionary history. Stephen K. Sanderson developed a “Darwinian conflict theory” addressing reproductive behavior, kinship, gender inequality, and religiosity.

In German sociology, scholars such as Meißelbach and Müller-Schneider integrated evolutionary perspectives into middle-range theories, highlighting complementarity between evolutionary and sociological accounts.

=== Technological perspectives ===
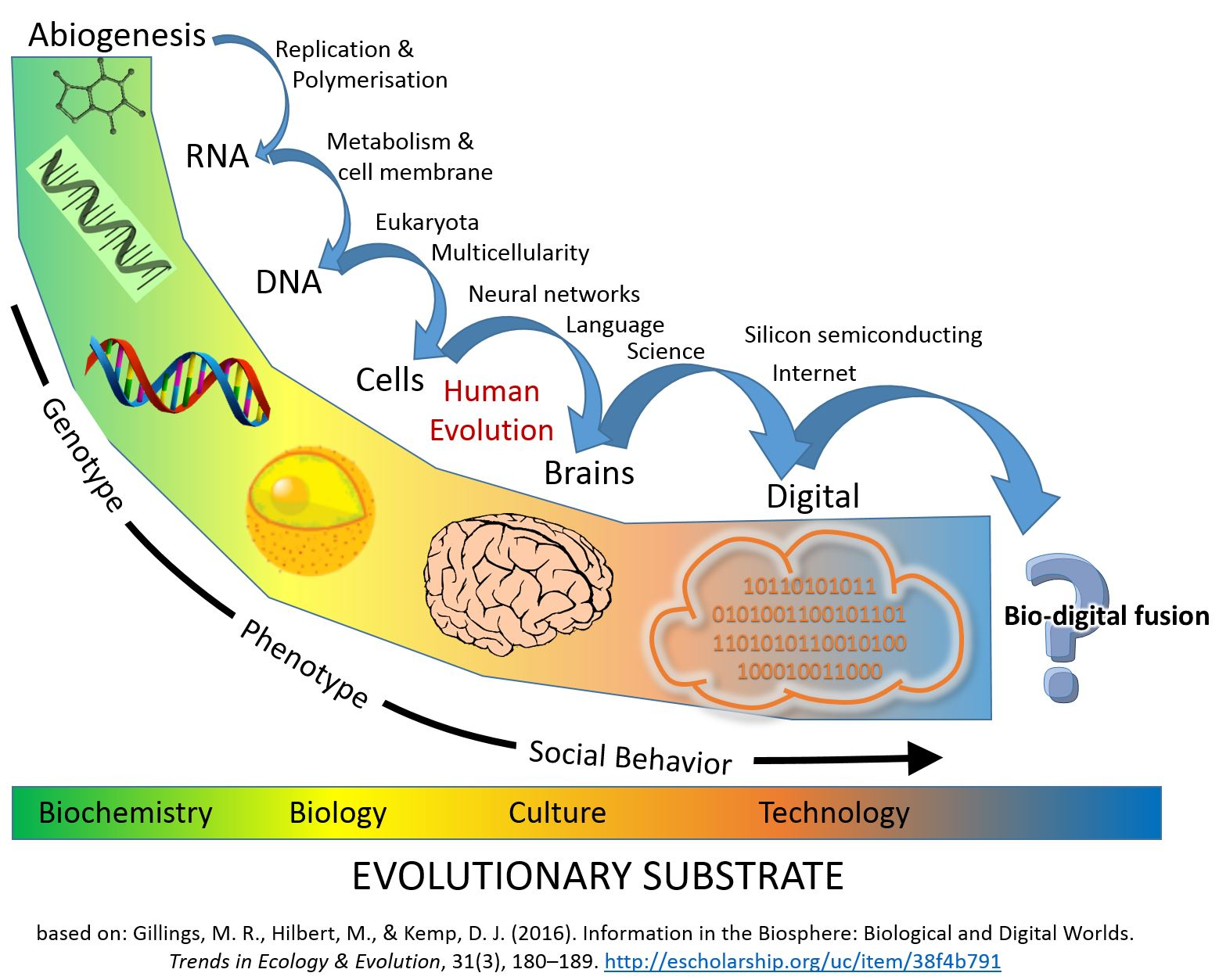
Schematic timeline of information and replicators in the biosphere: major evolutionary transitions in information processing

Many argue that the next stage of sociocultural evolution consists of a merger with technology, especially information processing technology. Several cumulative major transitions of evolution have transformed life through key innovations in information storage and replication, including RNA, DNA, multicellularity, and also language and culture as inter-human information processing systems. in this sense it can be argued that the carbon-based biosphere has generated a system (human society) capable of creating technology that will result in a comparable evolutionary transition. "Digital information has reached a similar magnitude to information in the biosphere. It increases exponentially, exhibits high-fidelity replication, evolves through differential fitness, is expressed through artificial intelligence (AI), and has facility for virtually limitless recombination. Like previous evolutionary transitions, the potential symbiosis between biological and digital information will reach a critical point where these codes could compete via natural selection. Alternatively, this fusion could create a higher-level superorganism employing a low-conflict division of labor in performing informational tasks...humans already embrace fusions of biology and technology. We spend most of our waking time communicating through digitally mediated channels, ...most transactions on the stock market are executed by automated trading algorithms, and our electric grids are in the hands of artificial intelligence. With one in three marriages in America beginning online, digital algorithms are also taking a role in human pair bonding and reproduction".

=== The role of war in the development of states and societies ===
Particularly since the end of the Cold War, there has been a growing number of scholars in the social sciences and humanities who came to complement the more presentist neo-evolutionary research with studies into the more distant past and its human inhabitants. A key element in many of these analyses and theories is warfare, which Robert L. Carneiro called the "prime mover in the origin of the state". He theorizes that given the limited availability of natural resources, societies will compete against each other, with the losing group either moving out of the area now dominated by the victorious one, or, if the area is circumscribed by an ocean or a mountain range and re-settlement is thus impossible, will be either subjugated or killed. Thus, societies become larger and larger, but, facing the constant threat of extinction or assimilation, they were also forced to become more complex in their internal organisation both in order to remain competitive as well as to administer a growing territory and a larger population.

Carneiro's ideas have inspired great number of subsequent research into the role of war in the process of political, social, or cultural evolution. An example of this is Ian Morris who argues that given the right geographic conditions, war not only drove much of human culture by integrating societies and increasing material well-being, but paradoxically also made the world much less violent. Large-scale states, says Morris, evolved because only they provided enough stability both internally and externally to survive the constant conflicts which characterise the early history of smaller states, and the possibility of war will continue to force humans to invent and evolve. War drove human societies to adapt in a step-wise process, and each development in military technology either requires or leads to comparable developments in politics and society.

Many of the underlying assumptions of Morris's thinking can be traced back in some form or another not only to Carneiro but also to Jared Diamond, and particularly his 1997 book Guns, Germs, and Steel. Diamond, who explicitly opposes racist evolutionary tales, argues that the ultimate explanation of why different human development on different continents is the presence or absence of domesticable plants and animals as well as the fact that the east–west orientation of Eurasia made migration within similar climates much easier than the south–north orientation of Africa and the Americas. Nevertheless, he also stresses the importance of conflict and warfare as a proximate explanation for how Europeans managed to conquer much of the world, given how societies who fail to innovate will "tend to be eliminated by competing societies".

Similarly, Charles Tilly argues that what drove the political, social, and technological change which, after centuries of great variation with regard to states, lead to the European states ultimately all converging on the national state was coercion and warfare: "War wove the European network of national states, and preparation for war created the internal structures of states within it." He describes how war became more expensive and complex due to the introduction of gunpowder and large armies and thus required significantly large states in order to provide the capital and manpower to sustain these, which at the same time were forced to develop new means of extraction and administration.

However, Norman Yoffee has criticised such theorists who, based on general evolutionary frameworks, came to formulate theories of the origins of states and their evolution. He claimed that in no small part due to the prominence of neoevolutionary explanations which group different societies into groups in order to compare them and their progress both to themselves and to modern ethnographic examples, while focusing mostly on political systems and a despotic élite who held together a territorial state by force, "much of what has been said of the earliest states, both in the professional literature as well as in popular writings, is not only factually wrong but also is implausible in the logic of social evolutionary theory".

=== Neoevolutionism ===
Neoevolutionism is a social theory attempting to explain the evolution of societies by drawing on Charles Darwin's theory of evolution while discarding some dogmas of the previous theories of social evolutionism. Neoevolutionism is concerned with long-term, evolutionary social change and with the regular patterns of development that may be seen in unrelated, widely separated cultures.

== See also ==
- Accelerating change
- Biocultural evolution
- Clash of Civilizations
- Critical juncture theory
- Cultural diversity
- Cultural evolution
- Cultural materialism
- Cultural neuroscience
- Cultural selection theory
- Diffusion of innovations
- Dual inheritance theory
- Economic determinism
- Edward Burnett Tylor
- Evolutionary anthropology
- Environmental racism
- Extended order
- Franz Boas
- Futures studies
- Historicism
- Institutional memory
- Julian Steward
- Leslie White
- Lewis Henry Morgan
- Memetics
- Moral progress
- Neoevolutionism
- Neuroculture
- Origin of language
- Origin of speech
- Origins of society
- Population dynamics
- Punctuated equilibrium
- Rationalization (sociology)
- Raciolinguistics
- Reformism
- Social Darwinism
- Social cycle theory
- Social dynamics
- Social implications of the theory of evolution
- Societal collapse
- Sociocultural system
- Social progress
- Symbolic culture
- Technological evolution

== Cited sources ==
- Sztompka, Piotr (2002). Socjologia. Znak. ISBN 83-240-0218-9.

== Bibliography ==
- The Philosophy of Positivism
- Robert Carneiro, Evolutionism in Cultural Anthropology: A Critical History. Westview Press, Boulder, CO, 2003.
- Jared Diamond, The World until Yesterday: What Can We Learn from Traditional Societies?, Penguin Books, 2012 (ISBN 978-0-141-02448-6).
- Evans-Pritchard, Sir Edward, A History of Anthropological Thought, 1981, Basic Books, Inc., New York.
- Graber, Robert B., A Scientific Model of Social and Cultural Evolution, 1995, Thomas Jefferson University Press, Kirksville, MO.
- Harris, Marvin, The Rise of Anthropological Theory: A History of Theories of Culture, 1968, Thomas Y. Crowell, New York.
- Hatch, Elvin, Theories of Man and Culture, 1973, Columbia University Press, New York.
- Hays, H. R., From Ape to Angel: An Informal History of Social Anthropology, 1965, Alfred A. Knopf, New York.
- Johnson, Allen W. and Earle, Timothy, The Evolution of Human Societies: From Foraging Group to Agrarian State, 1987, Stanford University Press.
- Kaplan, David and Manners, Robert, Culture Theory, 1972, Waveland Press, Inc., Prospect Heights, Illinois.
- Kuklick, Henrika, The Savage Within: The Social History of British Anthropology, 1885–1945, 1991, Cambridge University Press, Cambridge.
- McGilchrist, Iain, The Master and His Emissary: The Divided Brain and the Making of the Western World, 2009, Yale University Press, US and London.
- Mesoudi, A. (2007). Using the methods of experimental social psychology to study cultural evolution. Journal of Social, Evolutionary & Cultural Psychology, 1(2), 35–58. Full text
- Mesoudi, A. Cultural Evolution: How Darwinian Theory Can Explain Human Culture and Synthesize the Social Sciences, 2011, University of Chicago Press, ISBN 978-0-226-52044-5
- Morgan, John Henry, In the Beginning: The Paleolithic Origins of Religious Consciousness 2007 Cloverdale Books, South Bend. ISBN 978-1-929569-41-0
- Raoul Naroll and William T. Divale. 1976. Natural Selection in Cultural Evolution: Warfare versus Peaceful Diffusion. American Ethnologist 3: 97–128.
- Segal, Daniel (2000) Western Civ" and the Staging of History in American Higher Education The American Historical Review, Vol. 105, No. 3 (Jun., 2000), pp. 770–805 doi:10.2307/2651809
- Seymour-Smith, Charlotte, Macmillan Dictionary of Anthropology, 1986, Macmillan, New York.
- Stocking Jr., George W., Race, Culture, and Evolution: Essays in the History of Anthropology, 1968, The Free Press, New York.
- Stocking Jr., George W., After Tylor: British Social Anthropology 1888–1951, 1995, The University of Wisconsin Press.
- Stocking, George, Victorian Anthropology, Free Press, 1991, ISBN 0-02-931551-4
- Sztompka, Piotr, The Sociology of Social Change, Blackwell Publishers, 1994, ISBN 0-631-18206-3
- Trigger, Bruce, Sociocultural Evolution: Calculation and Contingency (New Perspectives on the Past), Blackwell Publishers, 1998, ISBN 1-55786-977-4
- Winthrop, Robert H., Dictionary of Concepts in Cultural Anthropology, 1991, Greenwood Press, New York.
- Ovcharov D. A. (2024), The problem of the social and natural in man in foreign philosophical thought of the second half of the XX – early XXI centuries: historical and philosophical analytical review, Bulletin of Vyatka State University, No. 2 (152) (2024), pp. 74-80, doi:10.25730/VSU.7606.24.024.

Readings from an evolutionary anthropological perspective

- Two special issues on the evolution of culture:
  - Evolutionary Anthropology: Issues, News, and Reviews Volume 12, Issue 2, Pages 57–108 (April 2003)
    - The evolution of culture: New perspectives and evidence (p 57–60) Charles H. Janson, Eric A. Smith
    - Making space for traditions (p 61–70) Dorothy Fragaszy
    - Traditions in monkeys (p 71–81) Susan Perry, Joseph H. Manson
    - Is culture a golden barrier between human and chimpanzee? (p 82–91) Christophe Boesch
    - Cultural panthropology (p 92–105) Andrew Whiten, Victoria Horner, Sarah Marshall-Pescini
    - The fossil record – Human and nonhuman (p 106–108) Eric Delson
  - Evolutionary Anthropology: Issues, News, and Reviews Volume 12, Issue 3, Pages 109–159 (2003)
    - On stony ground: Lithic technology, human evolution, and the emergence of culture (p 109–122) Robert Foley, Marta Mirazón Lahr
    - The evolution of cultural evolution (p 123–135) Joseph Henrich, Richard McElreath
    - The adaptive nature of culture (p 136–149) Michael S. Alvard
    - Do animals have culture? (p 150–159) Kevin N. Laland, William Hoppitt
