= Circumscription theory =

Political theory

The circumscription theory is a theory of the role of warfare in state formation in political anthropology, created by anthropologist Robert Carneiro. The theory has been summarized in one sentence by Schacht: “In areas of circumscribed agricultural land, population pressure led to warfare that resulted in the evolution of the state”. The more circumscribed an agricultural area is, Carneiro argues, the sooner it politically unifies.

== The theory in brief ==
The theory begins with some assumptions. Warfare usually disperses people rather than uniting them. Environmental circumscription occurs when an area of productive agricultural land is surrounded by a less productive area such as the mountains, desert, or sea. Application of extensive agriculture would bring severely diminishing returns.

If there is no environmental circumscription, then losers in a war can migrate out from the region and settle somewhere else. If there is environmental circumscription, then losers in warfare are forced to submit to their conquerors, because migration is not an option and the populations of the conquered and conqueror are united. The new state organization strives to alleviate the population pressure by increasing the productive capacity of agricultural land through, for instance, more intensive cultivation using irrigation.

== Primary and secondary state development ==
Primary state development occurred in the six original states of the Nile Valley, Peru, Mesoamerican, Yellow River Valley China, Indus River Valley, and Mesopotamia. Secondary state development occurred in states that developed from contact with already existing states. Primary state development occurred in areas with environmental circumscription.

The presumption, under the Carneiro Hypothesis, is that agricultural intensification, and the social coordination and coercion necessary to achieve this end was a result of warfare in which vanquished populations could not disperse; the coercive coordination necessary for increased production of surplus is, under Carneiro's hypothesis, a causal factor in the origins of the State. For example, the mountainous river valleys of Peru which descend to the Pacific coast were severely environmentally circumscribed. Amazonian populations could always disperse and maintain sparse contact with other, potentially hostile, neighbors, whereas Andean coastal populations could not.

== Criticism ==
Carneiro's theory has been criticized by the Dutch "early state school" emerging in the 1970s around cultural anthropologist Henri J.M. Claessen, on the ground that considerable contrary evidence can be found to Carneiro's theory. There are also cases of circumscribed environments and violent cultures which have failed to develop states, for example in the narrow highland valleys of interior Papua New Guinea, or the north west Pacific coastlines of North America. Also for example, the formation of some early states in East Africa, Sri Lanka, and Polynesia do not easily fit with Carneiro's model. Hence Claessen's school developed a "complex interaction model" to explain early state formation, in which factors such as ecology, social and demographic structures, economic conditions, conflicts, and ideology become aligned in ways which favour state organisation.

== Later development and revision ==
Carneiro has since revised his theory in various ways. He has argued that population concentration can act as a lower level impetus for tribal conflict than geographic circumscription. He has also argued that, in addition to the necessities of conquest, a more important reason for creation of chiefdoms was the rise of war chiefs who use their military loyalists to take over a group of villages and become paramount chiefs. The theory also has since been applied to many other contexts, such as the Zulu kingdom. One of leading experts on world-system theory, Christopher Chase-Dunn, noted in 1990 that the circumscription theory is applicable for the global system. Since the modern world system, being global, is completely circumscribed, the factor of circumscription is supposed to bring about the political unification of the world as it had done on regional scales on numerous occasions in the past. The thesis was further developed by historian Max Ostrovsky who widely used the circumscription theory in his book. The works of Chase-Dunn and Ostrovsky linked the circumscription theory with Carneiro's other theory of the political unification of the world. In the "Foreword" to Ostrovsky's book Carneiro acknowledges that he unjustly "abandoned" the circumscription theory in the Bronze Age. Carneiro's later interview contains his answer on the intriguing question, "Are we circumscribed now?"

== Bibliography ==
- Carneiro, R. L. (1970). "A Theory of the Origin of the State". Science. 169 (3947): 733–738. Bibcode:1970Sci...169..733C. doi:10.1126/science.169.3947.733. PMID 17820299. S2CID 11536431.
- Carneiro, R. L. The Muse of History and the Science of Culture. New York: Kluwer Academic/Plenum Publishers, 2000.
- Lewellen, Ted C. 1992. Political anthropology: An Introduction, Second Edition. Westport Connecticut, London: Bergin and Garvey, pp. 54–55.
- Claessen, H. J. M, Structural change; evolution and evolutionism in cultural anthropology. Leyden: CNWS, 2000
