= Gerhard Lenski =

American sociologist

Gerhard Emmanuel "Gerry" Lenski, Jr. (August 13, 1924 – December 7, 2015) was an American sociologist known for contributions to the sociology of religion, social inequality, and introducing the ecological-evolutionary theory. He spent much of his career as a professor at the University of North Carolina at Chapel Hill, where he served as chair of the Department of Sociology, 1969–72, and as chair of the Division of Social Sciences, 1976–78.

== Life and career ==
Lenski was born and raised in Washington, DC, the son of a Lutheran pastor, the grandson of German-born theologian Richard Charles Henry Lenski, and the nephew of children's author Lois Lenski. He attended Yale University where he received a BA degree in 1947, after serving as a cryptographer with the 8th Air Force in England in World War II, and then earned his PhD from Yale in 1950.

Lenski was awarded a Pre-doctoral Fellowship by the Social Science Research Council, 1949–50, and later a Senior Faculty Fellowship, 1961–62; a Guggenheim Fellowship, 1972–73; and IREX Senior Faculty Exchange Fellowships, for Poland, 1978, and Hungary, 1988. He served as Vice President of the American Sociological Association, 1969–70, and was nominee for president in 1972. He was also President of the Southern Sociological Society, 1977–78 and elected Fellow of the American Academy of Arts and Sciences, 1976. In 2002, he was awarded the Career of Distinguished Scholarship Award by the American Sociological Association.

His writings have been translated into German, Swedish, Spanish, Polish, and Chinese (both mainland and Taiwanese translations).

Lenski married poet Jean Cappelmann in 1948. He and Jean Lenski were active in the Civil Rights Movement and opponents of the Vietnam War. They had four children, including evolutionary biologist Richard Lenski. Following Jean's death in 1994, he married Ann Bonar, widow of sociologist Hubert "Tad" Blalock. Lenski died in Edmonds, Washington at the age of 91.

== Scholarly work ==
=== Sociology of religion ===
Much of Lenski's earliest work dealt with the sociology of religion and culminated in the publication of The Religious Factor. He defines religion as "a system of beliefs about the nature of force(s) ultimately shaping man's destiny and the practices associated therewith, shared by the members of a group. A reviewer in Commentary described the book as a "major achievement" in an often-neglected subfield, and Robert Wuthnow has referred to this volume as "arguably one of a handful of 'classics' among contributions by American sociologists to the social scientific study of religion."

In 1958, Lenski's empirical inquiry into "religion's impact on politics, economics, and family life" in the Detroit area revealed, among other insights, that there were significant differences between Catholics on the one hand and (white) Protestants and Jews on the other hand with regard to economics and the sciences. Lenski's findings supported basic hypotheses of Max Weber's work The Protestant Ethic and the Spirit of Capitalism. According to Lenski, "the contributions of Protestantism to material progress have been largely unintended by-products of certain distinctive Protestant traits. This was a central point in Weber's theory." Lenski noted that more than a hundred years prior to Weber, John Wesley, one of the founders of the Methodist Church, had observed that "diligence and frugality" made Methodists wealthy. "In an early era, Protestant asceticism and dedication to work, as noted by both Wesley and Weber, seem to have been important patterns of action contributing to economic progress. Both facilitated the accumulation of capital, so critically important to the economic growth and development of nations." However, Lenski said, asceticism was rare among modern Protestants, and the distinctive Protestant doctrine of "the calling" was largely forgotten. Instead, modern (white) Protestants and Jews had a high degree of "intellectual autonomy" that facilitated scientific and technical advance. By contrast, Lenski pointed out, Catholics developed an intellectual orientation which valued "obedience" to the teachings of their church above intellectual autonomy, which made them less inclined to enter scientific careers. Catholic sociologists had come to the same conclusions.

Lenski traced these differences back to the Reformation and the Catholic church's reaction to it. In Lenski's view, the Reformation encouraged intellectual autonomy among Protestants, in particular Anabaptists, Puritans, Pietists, Methodists, and Presbyterians. In the Middle Ages, there had been tendencies toward intellectual autonomy, as exemplified in men like Erasmus. But after the Reformation, the Catholic church leaders increasingly identified these tendencies with Protestantism and heresy and demanded that Catholics be obedient and faithful to ecclesiastical discipline. In Lenski's opinion, his study showed that these differences between Protestants and Catholics survived to the present day. As a consequence, "none of the predominantly and devoutly Catholic nations in the modern world can be classified as a leading industrial nation. Some Catholic nations - such as France, Italy, Argentina, Brazil, and Chile - are quite highly industrialized, but none of them are leaders in the technological and scientific fields, nor do they seem likely to become so. Recently [1963] some Brazilian Catholic social scientists compared their country's progress with that of the United States and concluded that the chief factor responsible for the differential rates of development is the religious heritage of the two nations."

=== Ecological-evolutionary theory ===
In subsequent publications (Power and Privilege, 1966; Human Societies, 1970; and Ecological-Evolutionary Theory, 2006), Lenski built on the foundations of evolutionary theory laid in the 18th century by A.R.J. Turgot, Adam Ferguson, John Millar, and Thomas Malthus, and in the 19th and 20th centuries by Charles Darwin, Lewis Henry Morgan, and Leslie White and the many biological evolutionists following him, to propose a more contemporary ecological and evolutionary theory of societal development from the Stone Age to the present. He has viewed the cumulation of information, especially technological information, as the most basic and most powerful factor in the evolution of human societies (though not the only one, as some of his critics have claimed). Lenski has argued that the evolution of cultural information is an extension of the evolution of genetic information with the characteristics of human societies being the product of the interaction of both genetic and cultural influences.

Members of any given society are united by a shared and partially distinctive culture and networks of social relationships with one another. These ties vary in intensity and distinctiveness depending on the magnitude of the society's store of information and the extent of contacts with other societies. With the acquisition of signals, and later, symbols, the ancestors of modern humans gained the critically important ability to share information acquired through individual experience. These and other later advances in the technologies of communication and transportation laid the foundations for major developments in political and economic systems, social inequality, science, ideology, and other spheres of life.

Lenski's theory has been well received. A former president of the American Political Science Association, Heinz Eulau, described Power and Privilege as a "masterpiece of comparative social analysis" and Ralf Dahrendorf referred to it as "an imaginative and substantial work [and] an indispensable guide." Sociological Theory devoted an issue of the journal to commentaries on, and appreciations of, his work (vol. 22, no. 2, June, 2004).

One feature of Lenski's work that has won fairly wide acceptance among sociologists, as reflected in its incorporation into leading introductory textbooks in the discipline, is his ecological and evolutionary typology of human societies first proposed in Power and Privilege and enhanced later in Human Societies and other publications This typology is based on a combination of two elements: (1) the kind of environment to which the society must adapt, and (2) its level of technological development. In its most basic form, Lenski identifies seven types of societies:

- Societies of hunters and gatherers
- Horticultural societies
- Agricultural or agrarian societies
- Industrial societies
- Fishing societies
- Herding societies
- Maritime societies.

These types are often combined in various ways (for example, industrializing horticultural and agrarian societies, such as Ghana and Brazil in the late 20th century) and can be usefully subdivided into more or less advanced (e.g., simple and advanced horticultural societies).

An important feature of Lenski's theory has been his emphasis on the need for a broadly inclusive approach in theory building. In a 1988 article, he argued that macrosociological theory should be based on our knowledge of the entire universe of human societies, past as well as present, and should seek to explain the major features of that universe, both its uniformities and its variations. This is undoubtedly a feature of the theory that many sociologists find troubling and unattractive because of the tradition developed in American sociology in the twentieth century of focusing theory and research on one's own society during a limited time period (i.e., American society in the 20th century) or a handful of societies (e.g., modern industrial societies) during an equally limited span of time.

=== Critique of Marxism ===
Another notable feature of Lenski's work has been his interest in Marxist societies. This grew out of his concern for the forces shaping societal development. Karl Marx, who had a major influence on sociological thought in the mid-twentieth century, had a very optimistic view of human nature that is reflected in his belief in the inevitability of communism in the future when the governing principle in human societies would be "from each according to his ability, to each according to his need." Lenski viewed the Marxist societies of the 20th century as important, but too often neglected, social experiments that put Marx's view of human nature to the test and found it wanting. His earlier work in the 1950s on status inconsistency (i.e. social class divisions and ethnic tension and discrimination) had received a positive reception among a number of influential Eastern European sociologists who found it a much more effective tool than the communist party's official model for analyzing and understanding the realities of social inequality in their societies, while at the same time providing a useful tool for challenging an increasingly unacceptable Communist social order.
