= Free lunch (disambiguation) =

A free lunch is a meal offered as a sales enticement.

Free Lunch may also refer to:

== Literature ==
- Free Lunch: How the Wealthiest Americans Enrich Themselves at Government Expense and Stick You With The Bill, a 2007 nonfiction book by David Cay Johnston
- The Free Lunch, a 2001 novel by Spider Robinson
- Free Lunch (book), a 2019 nonfiction book by Rex Ogle

== Music ==
- "Free Lunch" (song), by Isaiah Rashad
- Free Lunch, an EP by Wale

== Other uses ==
- National School Lunch Program, a United States government program.
- No such thing as a free lunch, an economic concept.
- No free lunch theorem, mathematical folklore.
- No free lunch in search and optimization, mathematical theorem.
