= German Physical Society =

Physics organisation in Germany

Deutsche Physikalische Gesellschaft e.V.
- Deutsche Physikalische Gesellschaft
- Abbreviation: DPG
- Formation: 1845
- Type: Scientific
- Purpose: Research
- Location: Germany
- Members: 52,220 (2022)
- Key people: Klaus Richter (President)
- Website: http://www.dpg-physik.de/index.html

The German Physical Society (German: Deutsche Physikalische Gesellschaft, DPG) is the oldest organisation of physicists. DPG's 2025 worldwide membership is cited as 50,668, with a peak of 63,012 in 2014. It holds an annual conference (Jahrestagung) and multiple spring conferences (Frühjahrstagungen), which are held at various locations and along topical subjects of given sections of the DPG. The DPG concerns the fields of pure and applied physics and aims to foster connections among German physicists, as well as the exchange of ideas between its members and foreign colleagues. The bylaws of the DPG commit the organization and its members to maintain scientific integrity and ethics, including freedom, tolerance, truthfulness, and dignity in scientific work, as well as the promotion of gender equality in the fields of physics and related sciences.

== Meetings ==
The DPG itself does not carry out any research, but its conferences promote the sharing of information about the latest findings in the field of physics. The primary conferences hosted by DPG are the DPG-Spring-Meetings, which are held annually at venues across Germany. The DPG-Fall-Meetings are focused around a single research topic. The German Conference of Women in Physics is an annual conference held since 1997 and was supported by DPG until 2019. DPG also runs a nationwide network for physics students in the "Young DPG" (jDPG) working group, which hosts workshops and networking meetings. In partnership with the Bonn-Cologne Graduate School of Physics and Astronomy (BCGS), the DPG also provides a platform for students of the school to network with leaders in the field with the annual BCGS Weekend Seminar: a retreat with physics lectures across several areas including excursions and social events.

== Awards and school projects ==
The DPG honours outstanding achievements in physics with awards of international repute. The highest awards which are presented by the DPG are the Max Planck Medal for work in theoretical physics, first awarded in 1929, and the Stern–Gerlach Medal for work in experimental physics, first awarded in 1933. Some awards, such as the Gustav Hertz Prize for Young Physicists, intend to foster young talent. Others are awarded by the DPG in cooperation with other organisations in Germany and abroad, such as the Max Born Medal and Prize or the Otto Hahn Prize. The Medal for Natural Science Journalism is awarded by the DPG to individuals who have made exceptional contributions to communicating scientific facts to the general public. In addition, the DPG awards prizes to school graduates across the country for outstanding achievements in physics, the so called DPG-Abiturpreis or the DPG-Buchpreis. It supports competitions for school students such as the Jugend forscht, a national research contest for young scientists.

=== Young Scientist Award for Socio- and Econophysics ===
Since 2002, the Fachverband Physik sozio-ökonomischer Systeme (Physics of Socio-Economic Systems Division) recognizes "outstanding original contributions that use physical methods to develop a better understanding of socio-economic problems".

- 2002: Damien Challet
- 2003: Vasiliki Plerou
- 2004: Illes Farkas
- 2005: Reuven Cohen
- 2006: Xavier Gabaix
- 2007: Katarzyna Sznajd-Weron
- 2008: Fabrizio Lillo
- 2009: Duncan Watts
- 2010: Dirk Brockmann
- 2011: Santo Fortunato
- 2012: Arne Traulsen
- 2013: Vittoria Colizza
- 2014: Roger Guimera
- 2015: Matjaz Perc
- 2016: Mason Porter
- 2017: Francisco C. Santos
- 2018: Martin Rosvall
- 2019: Andrea Baronchelli
- 2020/21: Roberta Sinatra, Manlio DeDomenico
- 2022/23: Fariba Karimi, Dashun Wang
- 2024: Viola Priesemann
- 2025: Federico Battiston

=== DPG-Abiturpreis ===
The DPG-Abiturpreis is an award of the DPG, which is given annually to high school graduates nationwide in Germany for outstanding performance in physics. The prize has been awarded since the year 2000. The winners are selected by the physics teachers of the participating schools, who can nominate physics-interested and high-achieving high school graduates. The prize consists of an award certificate and a one-year free membership in the society, which allows students to network and exchange ideas on scientific topics.

== Publications ==
The DPG produces a range of various publications. The membership journal of the DPG Physik Journal provides news reports from the DPG and about physics in general. Besides, the DPG joins forces with the British Institute of Physics to publish the electronic open access journal New Journal of Physics. The articles published here have gone through a strict peer review in line with the stringent scientific quality standards propounded by the New Journal of Physics. Moreover, the DPG also publishes its conference programme every year under the name Verhandlungen der DPG (Programme Booklets for DPG Conferences), listing the abstracts of around 8,000 papers.

=== Historical publications ===
Publications of the DPG have included:

- Berichte der Deutschen Physikalischen Gesellschaft
- Verhandlungen der Deutschen Physikalischen Gesellschaft
- Physikalische Blätter (continued as Physik Journal)
- Fortschritte der Physik
- Zeitschrift für Physik (continued as European Physical Journal)

From the time of its creation in 1845, the DPG published Fortschritte der Physik and its Verhandlungen, but by 1919, the Verhandlungen had become too voluminous, so DPG chairman Arnold Sommerfeld formed a committee consisting of Albert Einstein, Eugen Goldstein, Fritz Haber, E. Jahnke, Karl Scheel, and Wilhelm Westphal, which recommended that a new journal, the Zeitschrift für Physik, should be established for rapid publication of original research articles by established scientists without peer review; it began publication the following year. In 1975 Zeitschrift für Physik was merged with Physics of Condensed Matter (ISSN 0340-2347). Zeitschrift für Physik was published as a 4-part journal from 1920–1997 by Springer-Verlag under the auspices of the DPG. During the early 20th century, it was considered one of the most prestigious journals in physics, with its golden years coinciding with the golden years of quantum mechanics. It was the vehicle used by those with avant-garde views and the young generation of quantum physicists in the 1920s.

== Physics and public relations ==
The DPG plays an active role in the dialogue between science and the general public with a range of popular scientific publications, physics outreach, and public events. These activities also include the Highlights of Physics, an annual physics festival organized jointly by the DPG and the Federal Ministry of Education and Research. It is the largest festival of its kind in Germany with around 30,000 visitors every year.

== In Bonn and Berlin ==
The DPG office, headed by the Chief Executive Bernhard Nunner, is located in the Physikzentrum Bad Honnef (physics conference center in Bad Honnef), in the neighborhood of the university and federal city of Bonn. The Physikzentrum is not only a meeting place and discussion forum of outstanding significance for physics in Germany but also an international brand for the discipline of physics. Students and cutting-edge scientists through to Nobel Prize winners meet here to share their thoughts and ideas on a scientific level. Teaching staff also gladly come to Bad Honnef time and again to attend advanced training courses relating to pure physics and the didactic aspects of this discipline, in the seminars held by the DPG. The DPG is also present in Germany's capital, Berlin. It has been running the Magnus-Haus in Berlin since its reunification with the Physical Society of East Germany in 1990. This urban palace, completed in 1760 and bearing the name of the natural scientist Gustav Magnus, has close links to the history of the DPG: it was the regular meeting place of scholars during the 19th century, which eventually resulted in the Physical Society of Berlin being founded in 1845 and later becoming the DPG. Today, it is a venue for meetings and lectures on physical and socio-political issues. The Magnus-Haus is also home to the DPG's historical archive.

== During the Nazi regime (1933-1945) ==
The DPG was in opposition to National Socialism's persecution of the Jews in general, and their promotion of Deutsche Physik, in particular. On 7 April 1933, barely two months after Adolf Hitler came to power on 30 January 1933, the Law for the Restoration of the Professional Civil Service, was passed; under this law, Jewish civil servants and regime opponents were removed from their jobs. These policies had significant effects on physics in Germany with 25% of the physicists holding academic positions in the period 1932–1933 lost due to the policies.

- At the end of 1938, the DPG called on its Jewish members to withdraw their membership. This was initiated by Herbert Stuart and Wilhelm Orthmann.
- Max von Laue, as chairman of the DPG, gave the opening address at the 1933 physics convention held in Würzburg. In it, he compared the persecution of Galileo and the oppression of his scientific views on the Solar theory of Copernicus to the then conflict and persecution over the theory of relativity by the proponents of Deutsche Physik, against Einstein's theory of relativity, labeled as “Jewish physics.”
- Johannes Stark (1874–1957), recipient of the Nobel Prize in Physics 1919, was a proponent of Deutsche Physik. Acting under the Führerprinzip, Stark attempted to become "dictator of physics," as part of a plan to reorganize and coordinate German scientific societies to National Socialist ideology and policies. These actions brought opposition from members of the DPG. For example, Max von Laue, in 1933, blocked Stark's regular membership in the Preußische Akademie der Wissenschaften. Also in 1933, Stark, President of the Physikalisch-Technische Reichsanstalt (PTR), ran for president of the DPG against Karl Mey, the industrial physicist and head of Osram. Stark only received two votes. In retribution, Stark canceled the DPG's use of its rooms in the PTR, deleted PTR travel expenses for its personnel to attend DPG meetings, and forbade PTR personnel from lecturing at DPG meetings.
- Carl Ramsauer, president of the DPG 1940 to 1945, and his deputy, Wolfgang Finkelnburg, steered a relatively independent course from the regime line and against Deutsche Physik, which was anti-Semitic and anti-theoretical physics, especially including modern physics, i.e., quantum mechanics. Early in 1942, as chairman of the DPG, Ramsauer, on Felix Klein's initiative and with the support of Ludwig Prandtl, submitted a petition to Reich Minister Bernhard Rust, at the Reichserziehungsministerium (Reich Education Ministry). The petition, a letter and six attachments, addressed the atrocious state of physics instruction in Germany, which Ramsauer concluded was the result of politicization of education.

== Reunification ==
After the conclusion of World War II, in 1946, von Laue initiated the founding of the Deutsche Physikalische Gesellschaft in only the British Zone, as the Allied Control Council would not initially allow organizations across occupation zone boundaries. The DPG was eventually also reinstituted individually in the American and French sectors. These individually established organizations were united in West Germany in 1950, only after the formation of the Federal Republic of Germany on 23 May 1949. It was only after the fall of the Berlin Wall that the DPG again fully unified across Germany.

== Presidents ==
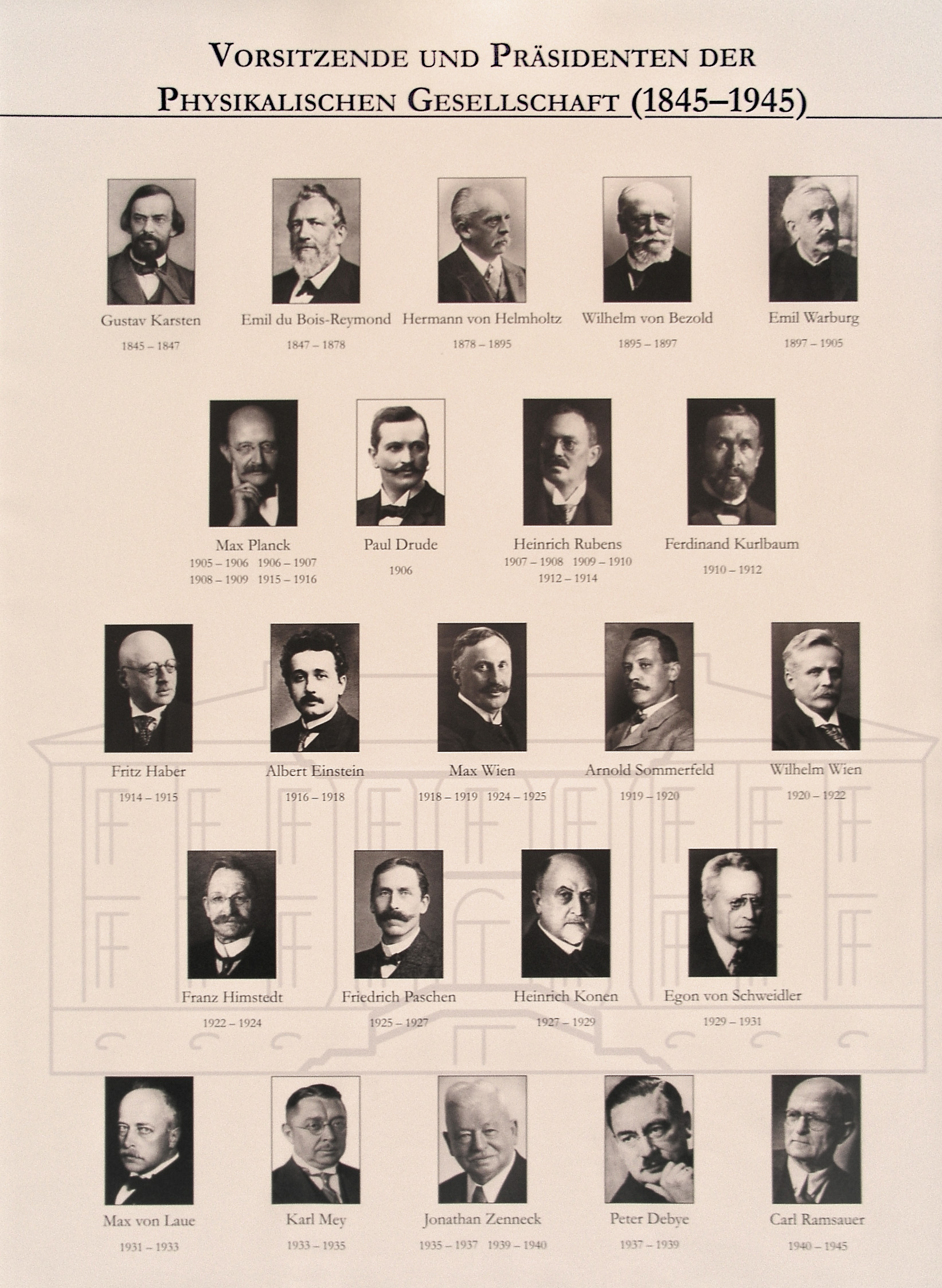
Presidents of Deutsche Physikalische Gesellschaft from 1845 to 1945

The president represents DPG and is responsible for implementing resolutions made by the various internal governing bodies. DPG keeps a record of all of the organization's presidents.

- 1845–47: Gustav Karsten
- 1847–78: Emil Du Bois-Reymond
- 1878–95: Hermann von Helmholtz
- 1895–97: Wilhelm von Bezold
- 1897–99: Emil Warburg
- 1899–1905: Emil Warburg
- 1905–06: Max Planck
- 1906: Paul Drude
- 1906–07: Max Planck
- 1907–08: Heinrich Rubens
- 1908–09: Max Planck
- 1909–10: Heinrich Rubens
- 1910–12: Ferdinand Kurlbaum
- 1912–14: Heinrich Rubens
- 1914–15: Fritz Haber
- 1915–16: Max Planck
- 1916–18: Albert Einstein
- 1918–19: Max Wien
- 1919–20: Arnold Sommerfeld
- 1920–22: Wilhelm Wien
- 1922–24: Franz Himstedt
- 1924–25: Max Wien
- 1925–27: Friedrich Paschen
- 1927–29: Heinrich Konen
- 1929–31: Egon von Schweidler
- 1931–33: Max von Laue
- 1933–35: Karl Mey
- 1935–37: Jonathan Zenneck
- 1937–39: Peter Debye
- 1939–40: Jonathan Zenneck
- 1940–45: Carl Ramsauer
- 1950–51: Jonathan Zenneck
- 1952–54: Karl A. Wolf
- 1954: Richard Becker
- 1955: Karl A. Wolf
- 1956–57: Walter Gerlach
- 1958–59: Ferdinand Trendelenburg
- 1960–61: Wilhelm Walcher
- 1962–63: Konrad Ruthardt
- 1964–65: Friedrich Bopp
- 1966–67: Wolfgang Finkelnburg
- 1968–69: Martin Kersten
- 1970–71: Karl Ganzhorn
- 1972–73: Werner Buckel
- 1974–75: Otto Koch
- 1976–77: Hans-Joachim Queisser
- 1978–79: Heinrich Welker
- 1980–81: Horst Rollnik
- 1982–83: Hans-Joachim Schmidt-Tiedemann
- 1984–86: Joachim Treusch
- 1986: Joachim Trümper
- 1988–90: Otto G. Folberth
- 1990–92: Theo Mayer-Kuckuk
- 1992–94: Herwig Schopper
- 1994–96: Hans-Günter Danielmeyer
- 1996–98: Markus Schwoerer
- 1998–2000: Alexander Bradshaw
- 2000–02: Dirk Basting
- 2002–04: Roland Sauerbrey
- 2004–06: Knut Urban
- 2006–08: Eberhard Umbach
- 2008–10: Gerd Litfin
- 2010–12: Wolfgang Sandner
- 2012–14: Johanna Stachel
- 2014–16: Edward G. Krubasik
- 2016–18: Rolf-Dieter Heuer
- 2018–20: Dieter Meschede
- 2020–22: Lutz Schröter
- 2022–24: Joachim Ullrich
- 2024–26: Klaus Richter (physicist)
- 2026–28: Heike Riel

== See also ==
- Lise Meitner Lectures
- European Physical Society
- Japan Society of Applied Physics
- Institute of Physics
- American Institute of Physics
