= Yamir Moreno =

Cuban physicist

- Born: 1970 (age 55–56); Havana
- Education: University of Havana; University of Zaragoza
- Scientific career
- Fields: Theoretical physics
- Workplaces: University of Zaragoza; International Centre for Theoretical Physics; Institute for Biocomputation and Physics of Complex Systems; WHO Collaborating Centre

Yamir Moreno (1970; Havana) is a professor of Physics at the Department of Theoretical Physics of the University of Zaragoza and Director of the Institute for Biocomputation and Physics of Complex Systems at the same institution.

== Early life ==
Prof. Yamir Moreno was born in 1970 in Havana, Cuba. After graduating with the highest marks in Physics at the University of Havana in 1993, he completed a Master in Physics in 1996 at the same institution. He obtained a (Summa Cum Laude) Ph.D. in theoretical physics in 2000 from the University of Zaragoza and the same year joined the International Centre for Theoretical Physics in Trieste, Italy.

== Career ==
Prof. Moreno returned to the University of Zaragoza in 2003 to join the Department of Theoretical Physics at the Faculty of Sciences and the Institute for Biocomputation and Physics of Complex Systems, where he created and has led the Complex Systems and Networks Lab since then. In 2011, he became the Scientific Secretary of the institute, followed by his appointment as deputy director from 2015 to 2019. Since February 2019, Prof. Moreno has been the Director of the institute. Prof. Moreno has served on several professional Societies. He became vice-president of the Complex Systems Society in 2013 and was elected its president from 2015 to 2018. He was Vice-president Secretary of the Network Science Society from 2015 to 2018, when he was elected as president for the term 2018–2022. Prof. Moreno was a member of the Future and Emerging Technology Advisory Group of the Framework Programmes for Research and Technological Development from 2014 to 2018 and served on the advisory board of the CS4HS' WHO Collaborating Centre at the University of British Columbia, Canada. Prof. Moreno was a deputy director (Complex Systems and Networks) at the ISI Foundation, where he was a first-class Fellow from 2013 to 2016. From 2017 to 2025, he was an External Faculty member of the Complexity Science Hub in Vienna, Austria. In September 2022, he became a Principal Scientist and Research Director as well as the Chairman of the Steering Committee of the Center for Artificial Intelligence (CENTAI) Institute, in Turin, Italy, positions that he held until December 2024.

Prof. Moreno has had an intense editorial service. Currently, he is the Editor-in-Chief of the Journal of Complex Networks (2024-) and Editor of PLoS Computational Biology(2021-) and of Proceedings of the Royal Society A(2022-). Prof. Moreno was a Divisional Associate Editor of Physical Review Letters (2014-2020), Editor of the New Journal of Physics(2018-2023) and of Chaos, Solitons & Fractals (2018-2025). He has also been a member of the Editorial Boards of Scientific Reports(2012-2018), Applied Network Science(2016-2022), and Frontiers in Physics(2018-2024), and Academic Editor of PLoS ONE (2010-2018).

Prof. Moreno was named a Fellow of the American Physical Society in 2021 and a Fellow of the Network Science Society in 2022. He received the Senior Scientific Award from the Complex Systems Society in 2019 and the Outstanding Service Award from the Complex Systems Society (2022) and the Network Science Society (2026).

=== Research ===
Prof. Moreno is known for his many contributions to topics related to the Structure and Dynamics of Complex Networked Systems, including pioneering works on disease transmission in networked populations, the study of nonlinear dynamical systems coupled to complex structures, on transport processes and diffusion with applications in communication and technological networks, on the dynamics of information and rumor propagation, as well as to evolutionary game theory, the emergence of collective behaviors in biological and social environments, the dynamics of Tuberculosis transmission and the structure and dynamics of Multilayer networks. Lately, he has also become a leading figure in the topics of Higher-Order Networks and the development of next-generation "generative" agent-based models. As of July 2026, his scientific production amounts to 310+ peer-reviewed publications with more than 60000 citations and an h-index of 94 (Google Scholar. Relevant contributions include journals like Physics Reports, Nature Physics, Nature Reviews Physics, Nature Human Behaviour, Nature Communications, Proc. Natl. Acad. Sci. USA, Phys. Rev. Lett., Phys. Rev. X, Science Advances, etc. Citation records can be found here and here.

Prof. Moreno is a co-author of the most cited Physics Reports of all time (Complex Networks and their applications, Phys. Rep. 424, 175-304 (2006), 14660+ citations). Prof. Moreno has supervised over 30 undergraduate students and 25 PhD Theses at the University of Zaragoza.

== Relevant Works ==
The full list of publications can be found here.

- de Arruda, Guilherme Ferraz; Rodrigues, Francisco A.; Moreno, Yamir (2018). "Fundamentals of spreading processes in single and multilayer complex networks". Physics Reports. 756: 1–59. arXiv:1804.08777. Bibcode:2018PhR...756....1D. doi:10.1016/j.physrep.2018.06.007. S2CID 13838683.
- Caldarelli, Guido; Wolf, Sarah; Moreno, Yamir (2018). "Physics of humans, physics for society". Nature Physics. 14 (9): 870. Bibcode:2018NatPh..14..870C. doi:10.1038/s41567-018-0266-x.
- E. Cozzo, G. Ferraz de Arruda, F. A. Rodrigues, and Y. Moreno, "Multiplex Networks: Basic Formalism and Structural Properties", Monograph Springer Briefs in Complexity, ISBN 978-3-319-92255-3 (2018).
- Kivela, M.; Arenas, A.; Barthelemy, M.; Gleeson, J. P.; Moreno, Y.; Porter, M. A. (2014-07-14). "Multilayer networks". Journal of Complex Networks. 2 (3): 203–271. arXiv:1309.7233. doi:10.1093/comnet/cnu016.
- Perc, Matjaž; Gómez-Gardeñes, Jesús; Szolnoki, Attila; Floría, Luis M.; Moreno, Yamir (2013-03-06). "Evolutionary dynamics of group interactions on structured populations: a review". Journal of the Royal Society Interface. 10 (80) 20120997. arXiv:1301.2247. doi:10.1098/rsif.2012.0997. PMC 3565747. PMID 23303223.
- Arenas, Alex; Díaz-Guilera, Albert; Kurths, Jurgen; Moreno, Yamir; Zhou, Changsong (2008). "Synchronization in complex networks". Physics Reports. 469 (3): 93–153. arXiv:0805.2976. Bibcode:2008PhR...469...93A. doi:10.1016/j.physrep.2008.09.002. S2CID 14355929.
- Boccaletti, S.; Latora, V.; Moreno, Y.; Chavez, M.; Hwang, D. (2006). "Complex networks: Structure and dynamics". Physics Reports. 424 (4–5): 175–308. Bibcode:2006PhR...424..175B. doi:10.1016/j.physrep.2005.10.009.
- Artiges, Emmanuel; Gracia-Lázaro, Carlos; Floría, Luis Mario; Moreno, Yamir (2019). "Replicator population dynamics of group interactions: Broken symmetry, thresholds for metastability, and macroscopic behavior". Phys. Rev. E. 100 (5) 052307. American Physical Society. arXiv:1909.06858. Bibcode:2019PhRvE.100e2307A. doi:10.1103/PhysRevE.100.052307. PMID 31869890.
