= Matjaž Perc =

Professor of Physics at the University of Maribor

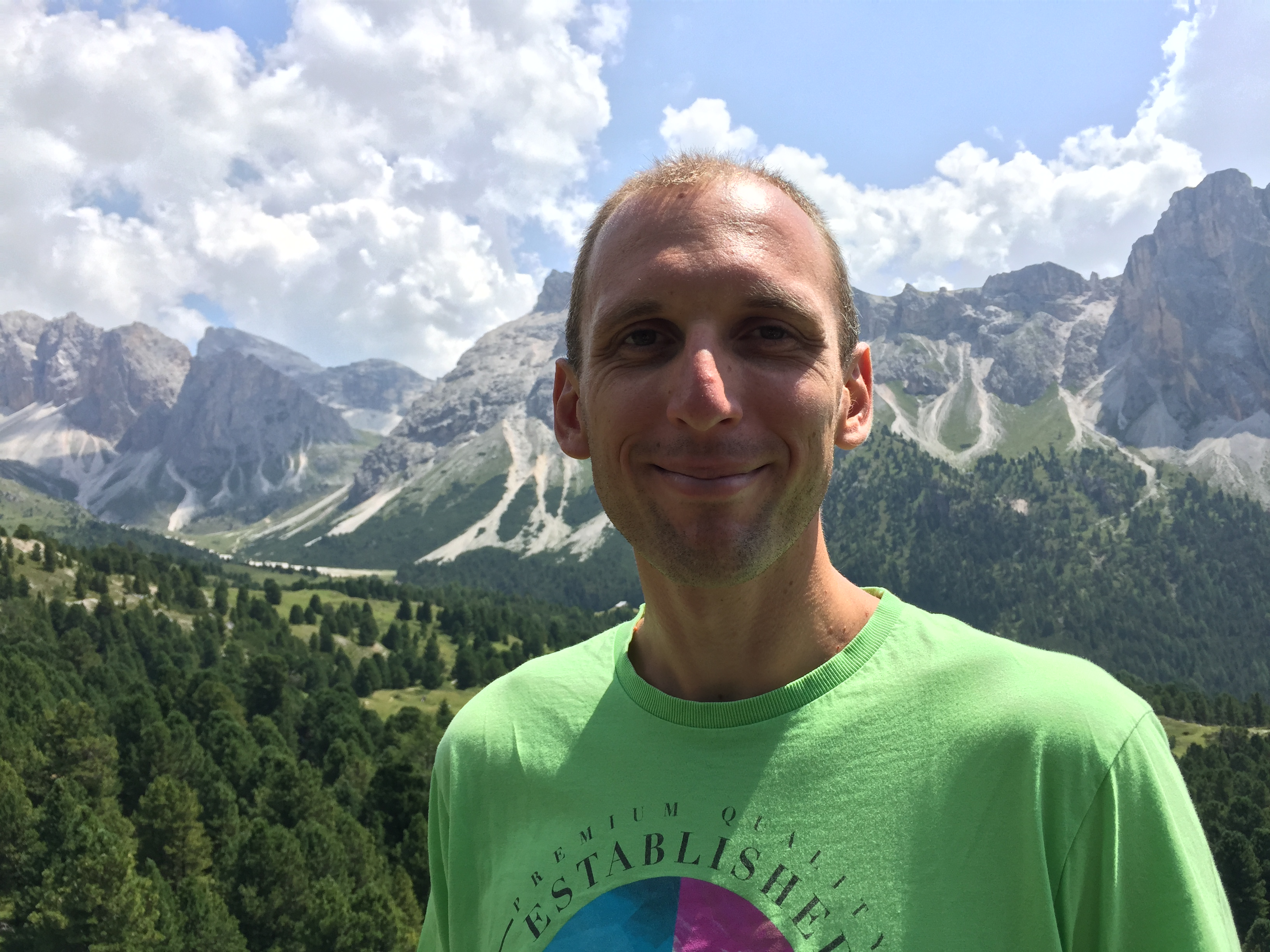
- Perc in July 2015, Val Gardena
- Born: August 10, 1979 (age 47); Maribor, Slovenia
- Education: University of Maribor
- Scientific career
- Fields: Statistical Physics, Complex Systems, Network Science, Evolutionary Game Theory
- Workplaces: University of Maribor
- Website: www.matjazperc.com Google Scholar arXiv

Matjaž Perc is Professor of Physics at the University of Maribor in Slovenia, and director of the Complex Systems Center Maribor. He is member of Academia Europaea and among top 1% most cited physicists according to Thomson Reuters Highly Cited Researchers. He is Outstanding Referee of the Physical Review and Physical Review Letters journals, and Distinguished Referee of EPL. He received the Young Scientist Award for Socio-and Econophysics in 2015. His research has been widely reported in the media and professional literature.

== Biography ==
Matjaž Perc studied physics at the University of Maribor. He completed his doctoral thesis on noise-induced pattern formation in spatially extended systems with applications to the nervous system, game-theoretical models, and social complexity. In 2009 he received the Zois Certificate of Recognition for outstanding research achievements in theoretical physics. In 2010 he became head of the Institute of Physics at the University of Maribor, and in 2011 he became full Professor of Physics. In 2015, Matjaž Perc established the Complex Systems Center Maribor. His research on complex systems covers evolutionary game theory, agent-based modeling, data analysis, and network science.

He is a member of the European Academy of Sciences and Arts and the Academia Europaea.

== Research ==
Matjaž Perc is an expert on the theory of cooperation on networks. He has applied Monte Carlo simulations and dynamical mean field theory to discover that stochastic perturbations resolve social dilemmas in a resonance-like manner. He has also pioneered self-organization as a way of stabilizing reward and punishment in structured populations, and he has proposed the introduction of discrete strategies in ultimatum games, which has contributed to the understanding of the fascinating complexity behind human bargaining. His research has helped to reveal the full potential of methods of non-equilibrium statistical physics in evolutionary game theory.

He has done research on the evolution of moral and double moral standards, the evolution of the most common English words and phrases, and the rise and fall of new words. He has discovered self-organization in the way how major scientific ideas propagate across the physics literature, which culminated in a simple mathematical regularity that is able to identify scientific memes.

In addition to his various original contributions, Matjaž Perc has provided the research community with several reviews and introductory articles on evolutionary games, the emergence of organized crime, collective phenomena in socio-economic systems, energy-saving mechanisms in nature, and the Matthew effect. By the number of citations, he is the most cited author of several physics journals including New Journal of Physics, Biosystems, Journal of the Royal Society Interface, Physical Review E.

== Awards ==
- 2018 received the Zois Award (named after Sigmund Zois).
- 2017 received USERN Prize in social sciences, for "Transitions Towards Cooperation in Human Societies".
- 2009 received the Zois Certificate of Recognition. Being only 30 years old at the time, he was the youngest receiver of the Zois certificate ever.

== Publications ==
For a full list see Matjaž Perc's ORCID page.

- Spatial coherence resonance in excitable media, Matjaž Perc, Phys. Rev. E 72, 016207 (2005)
- Coherence resonance in a spatial prisoner's dilemma game, Matjaž Perc, New J. Phys. 8, 22 (2006)
- Transition from Gaussian to Lévy distributions of stochastic payoff variations in the spatial prisoner's dilemma game, Matjaž Perc, Phys. Rev. E 75, 022101 (2007)
- Noise-guided evolution within cyclical interactions, Matjaž Perc and Attila Szolnoki, New J. Phys. 9, 267 (2007)
- Social diversity and promotion of cooperation in the spatial prisoner's dilemma game, Matjaž Perc and Attila Szolnoki, Phys. Rev. E 77, 011904 (2008)
- Making new connections towards cooperation in the prisoner's dilemma game, Attila Szolnoki, Matjaž Perc and Zsuzsa Danku, EPL 84, 50007 (2008)
- Topology-independent impact of noise on cooperation in spatial public goods games, Attila Szolnoki, Matjaž Perc and György Szabó, Phys. Rev. E 80, 056109 (2009)
- Resolving social dilemmas on evolving random networks, Attila Szolnoki and Matjaž Perc, EPL 86, 30007 (2009)
- Coevolutionary games - A mini review, Matjaž Perc and Attila Szolnoki, BioSystems 99, 109-125 (2010)
- Does strong heterogeneity promote cooperation by group interactions?, Matjaž Perc, New J. Phys. 13, 123027 (2011)
- Defense mechanisms of empathetic players in the spatial ultimatum game, Attila Szolnoki, Matjaž Perc and György Szabó, Phys. Rev. Lett. 109, 078701 (2012)
- Evolution of the most common English words and phrases over the centuries, Matjaž Perc, J. R. Soc. Interface 9, 3323-3328 (2012) (tables containing the most common English words and phrases are here)
- Self-organization of punishment in structured populations, Matjaž Perc and Attila Szolnoki, New J. Phys. 14, 043013 (2012)
- Evolutionary advantages of adaptive rewarding, Attila Szolnoki and Matjaž Perc, New J. Phys. 14, 093016 (2012)
- Correlation of positive and negative reciprocity fails to confer an evolutionary advantage: Phase transitions to elementary strategies, Attila Szolnoki and Matjaž Perc, Phys. Rev. X 3, 041021 (2013)
- Evolutionary dynamics of group interactions on structured populations: A review, Matjaž Perc, Jesús Gómez Gardeñes, Attila Szolnoki, Luis M. Floría and Yamir Moreno, J. R. Soc. Interface 10, 20120997 (2013)
- Inheritance patterns in citation networks reveal scientific memes, Tobias Kuhn, Matjaž Perc and Dirk Helbing, Phys. Rev. X 4, 041036 (2014) (see also the Physics Focus story here)
- Interdependent network reciprocity in evolutionary games, Zhen Wang, Attila Szolnoki and Matjaž Perc, Scientific Reports 3, 1183 (2013)
- Self-organization of progress across the century of physics, Matjaž Perc, Scientific Reports 3, 1720 (2013) (the n-gram viewer for publications of the American Physical Society is here)
- Antisocial pool rewarding does not deter public cooperation, Attila Szolnoki and Matjaž Perc, Proc. R. Soc. B 282, 20151975 (2015)
- The Matthew effect in empirical data, Matjaž Perc, J. R. Soc. Interface 11, 20140378 (2014)
- Saving human lives: What complexity science and information systems can contribute, Dirk Helbing, Dirk Brockmann, Thomas Chadefaux, Karsten Donnay, Ulf Blanke, Olivia Woolley-Meza, Mehdi Moussaid, Anders Johansson, Jens Krause, Sebastian Schutte and Matjaž Perc, J. Stat. Phys. 158, 735-781 (2015)
- Statistical physics of crime: A review, Maria R. D'Orsogna and Matjaž Perc, Phys. Life Rev. 12, 1-21 (2015)

== Editorial work ==
Matjaž Perc is editorial board member at Physical Review E, New Journal of Physics, EPL, European Physical Journal B, Advances in Complex Systems, Frontiers in Interdisciplinary Physics, International Journal of Bifurcation and Chaos, PLOS ONE, Scientific Reports, Royal Society Open Science, Chaos, Solitons & Fractals, and Applied Mathematics and Computation. He was also guest editor for the Proceedings of the National Academy of Sciences of the United States of America.
