= No Free Lunch (organization) =

No Free Lunch was a US-based advocacy organization holding that marketing methods employed by drug companies influence the way doctors and other healthcare providers prescribe medications. The group did outreach to convince physicians to refuse to accept gifts, money, or hospitality from pharmaceutical companies because it claims that these gifts create a conflict of interest for providers. The group also advocated for less involvement of drug companies in medical education and practice in a variety of other ways.

== History ==
The organization was founded in 2000 by Bob Goodman, an internist from New York City. Most of the group's approximately 500 members are doctors, though some are physician assistants, nurses and other practitioners.

The group made news in 2005 when the American Academy of Family Physicians refused to rent exhibition space to No Free Lunch for its annual scientific assembly. A spokesperson for the academy argued that the dialog between physicians and exhibitors is "important and healthy" and that No Free Lunch seeks to eliminate that dialog. Less than a week after the initial refusal, the academy reversed its decision and allowed No Free Lunch to rent a booth, citing discussion within the group and comments from members.

The American College of Physicians also refused to rent exhibit space to No Free Lunch at its Annual Session, citing an event in 2001, in which a person claiming to represent No Free Lunch escorted investigative journalists with a hidden camera onto the exhibit floor.

In collaboration with the American Medical Student Association, No Free Lunch organized a "pharmfree campaign", in which medical students and others discuss issues of pharmaceutical company involvement in the medical community.

== Advocacy ==
The group tries to get healthcare providers to sign the No Free Lunch pledge. Health care professionals who take the pledge agree to:

accept no money, gifts, or hospitality from the pharmaceutical industry; to seek unbiased sources of information and not rely on information disseminated by drug companies; and to avoid conflicts of interest in [their] practice, teaching, and/or research.

As of 2004, the pledge had about 300 signers. Patients can use a directory provided by the group to find doctors who have taken the pledge.

The group claims that doctors preferentially prescribe drugs that are marketed to them over better or cheaper options because they are beholden to drug companies from which they accept gifts. Some doctors argue that they are not influenced by drug company marketing and that it is thus not necessary to refuse gifts from pharmaceutical companies.

No Free Lunch also argues that doctors should not accept drug samples from drug companies to give to patients because the group believes that the samples will cause the doctors to prescribe those drugs over others. Drug company representatives argue that the free samples can be given to indigent patients.

The group also seeks to convince physicians not to rely on research provided by drug companies for their information about drugs but to base their decisions only on impartial scientific evidence. No free lunch works with an Australian group called Healthy Skepticism to urge doctors to rely on independent educational materials rather than materials paid for by drug companies for their drug information.

The group also calls for less involvement of drug companies in the funding of medical education.

No Free Lunch does not blame drug companies for trying to market their products; the group feels that this is the companies' job. Rather, it believes that physicians are allowing themselves to be courted and swayed by advertisers.

=== Pharmaceutical industry meetings ===
No Free Lunch argues that educational meetings that take place during meals paid for by drug companies constitute an advertising method known as direct-to-physician marketing, in which a drug company representative interacts with doctors and provides them with promotional information.

The Pharmaceutical Research and Manufacturers of America, a group that represents all major drug companies in the US, argues that meetings between drug representatives and doctors are an important way to educate doctors about their products, and that purchasing meals for doctors may be the only opportunity to fit such meetings into the physicians' busy schedules.

== See also ==
- Inverse benefit law
- Milton Friedman
- No free lunch theorem
- Robert Heinlein
- No such thing as a free lunch
