= Enzo Marinari =

Italian theoretical and computational physicist

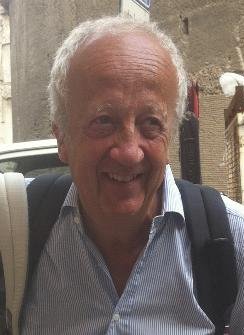
Enzo Marinari

Enzo Marinari (born on July 7, 1957, in Avellino) is an Italian theoretical and computational physicist. He has contributed to introducing several new algorithms in computational physics, such as Parallel Tempering, the SU(N) updating method and Constraint Allocation Flux Balance Analysis (CAFBA). He is a professor at the Physics Department of the Sapienza University of Rome.

== Education and career ==
Enzo Marinari got his physics degree at the Sapienza University of Rome in 1980. Until 1984 he worked as a staff scientist at the Theoretical Physics Institute of the CEA Saclay, in France. In 1988 he was nominated Associate Professor at the University of Rome Tor Vergata and in 1994 he became a full professor at the University of Cagliari. Since 1999 he is a full professor at the Physics Department of the Sapienza University of Rome in Italy.

From 1992 until 1994 he was contemporarily the Physics Director for the Northeast Parallel Architecture Center (NPAC) in Syracuse, NY, USA. During the period 2004-2011, he was the Scientific Director for physics of the Institute for Biocomputation and Physics of Complex Systems (BIFI) at the University of Zaragoza, Spain.

During his career Enzo Marinari has done research in different fields of physics, such as particle physics (QCD, string theory), statistical physics (spin glasses, disordered and complex systems, phase transitions, temperature chaos) and biophysics (metabolic and neural networks). He has been one of the founding members of the Spanish-Italian Janus collaboration and of the Italian APE collaboration, both promoting the use of computational methods in research in physics. He has written and edited several books and plays an active role in explaining science and its applications on mainstream media channels.

== Recognitions ==
In 1978 and 1979 Enzo Marinari received the Borsa Persico of the Accademia dei Lincei. In 1988 he was elected as best physicist under the age of 35 by the Accademia dei Lincei. In 1992 he received an essay prize from the Gravity Research Foundation.
