= Hidden cost =

Hidden cost may refer to:

- Externality, a cost or benefit to an uninvolved third party that arises as an effect of another party's (or parties') activity.
- Hidden fee, additional surcharge not included in the advertised price
- Indirect cost, a cost that is not directly accountable to a cost object
- No such thing as a free lunch, an adage indicating that where there are benefits there are also costs, although they may be hidden
- Opportunity cost, the value of the best alternative forgone

== See also ==
- True cost accounting
