= Josephine Van De Grift =

American writer (1894–1927)

Josephine Van de Grift
- Born: Helen Josephine Van de Grift; January 7, 1894; Shelbyville, Indiana, U.S.
- Died: August 21, 1927 (aged 33); Akron, Ohio, U.S.
- Occupations: Writer, journalist, screenwriter
- Spouse: William Henry Rigby Jr. (m. 1925)
- Children: 2, Mary Josephine Rigby and son
- Writing career
- Years active: 1914-1927
- Genre: short stories
- Notable awards: Harvard Workshop 47 for screenplay The Lonely Road; 1922

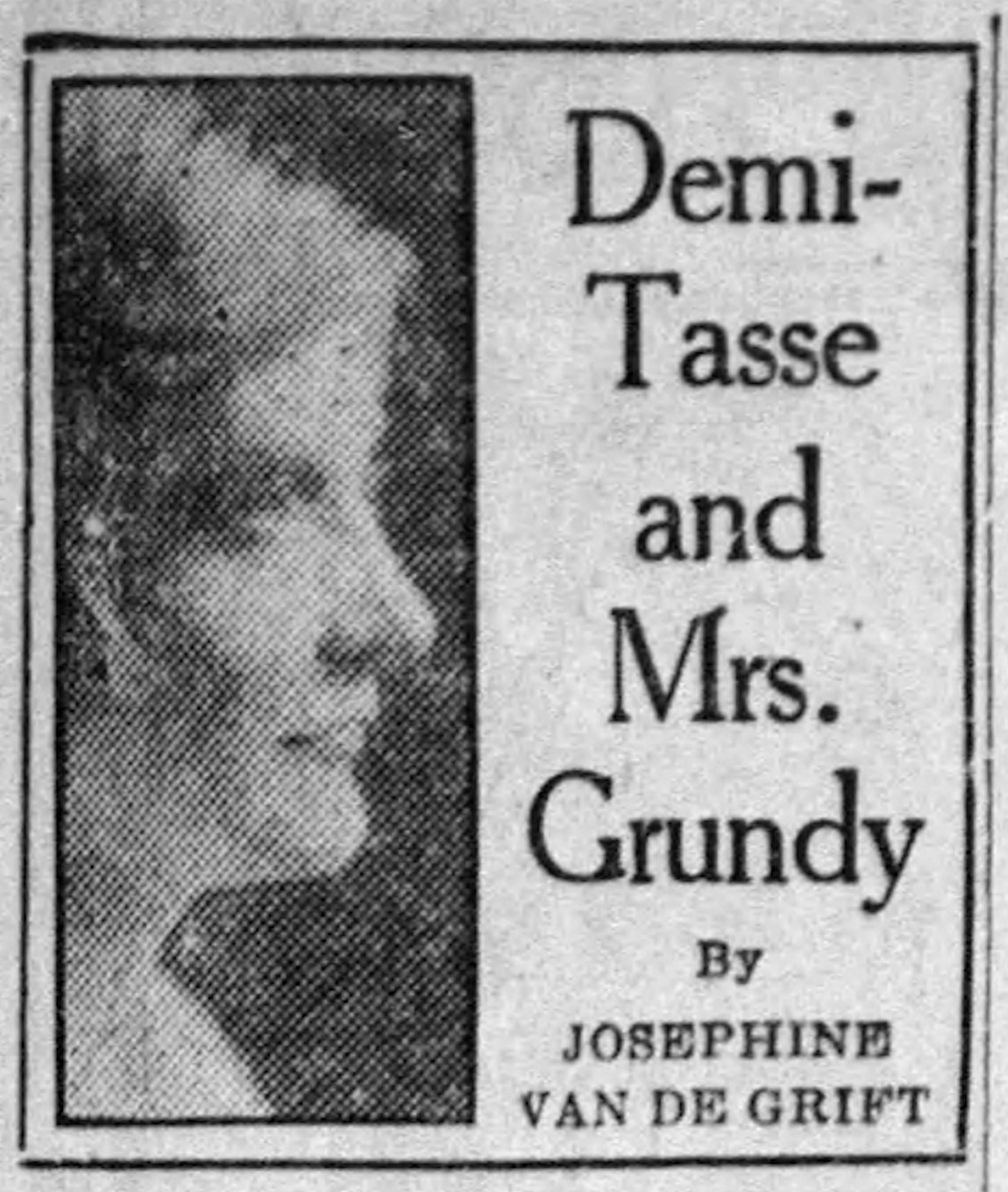
Column photo of Josephine Van De Grift for "Demi-Tasse & Mrs. Grundy"

Josephine Van De Grift in the Indianapolis Star Newspaper 1914

Josephine Van de Grift (January 7, 1894 – August 21, 1927) was an early 20th-century American woman writer and newspaper columnist for the Akron Beacon Journal in Akron, Ohio. She was born in Shelbyville, Indiana, to Bess "Bessie" Gates and Harry W. Vandegrift. She was known as Josephine Vandegrift, Josephine Van De Grift, and upon her marriage in her private life she was Mrs. William H. Rigby. To her readers she was known as "Jo".

== Career ==
In August 1922, her play The Lonely Road won her a scholarship to partake in Dr. George Pierce Baker's Harvard 47 Workshop in Cambridge, Mass.

From 1923 to 1925, she worked with the N.E.A. (Newspaper Enterprise Association) in New York interviewing notable persons such as John D. Rockefeller, Sr., Will Rogers, Ring Lardner, Mary Pickford, Charlie Chaplin, Dorothy Parker, Joan Gardner and others.

She joined the Blue Pencil Club, an elite literary guild in 1923–1924 during the time H.P. Lovecraft was also a member.

In 1923, she went undercover as a reporter on Broadway under the pseudonym of Huldah Benson, showcasing the "lure of the floodlights to a country girl". It was a time in the early 1920s where women dreamt of being on stage as chorus girls and actresses. The news agency she worked for had given her a "script" to memorize about her name, her history, her family - all fabricated while she was working undercover.

"I gave the history of my life as I had carefully prepared and rehearsed it. I was Huldah Benson and I was 23 and I had left home in Akron, Ohio to go on the stage. No, I hadn't any brothers or sisters and my mother was dead. Had I ever worked before? Oh, yes, I had given music lessons once and I used to sell records in a piano company back home"

she says as she introduces herself for the first time in New York as Huldah. The 6-part series was published nationwide in the newspapers, with accompanying illustrations for each segment of "Huldah"'s journey as a chorus girl on Broadway.

Her stories and daily column "Demi-Tasse and Mrs. Grundy" were published 1924–1927 in the Akron Beacon Journal. She wrote this daily column from her point of view about all topics ranging from day-to-day life in Akron, travelling, meeting her husband Bill in the 'Rigby's Books' bookstore (which is now the Akron Public Library), 1920s prohibition and speakeasys, raising a family, and book and film reviews. Following the birth of her daughter, Mary, born New Years Eve 1925, several of her columns would talk of Mary and her ambitions. A year after Mary's birth, Josephine published a poem to her daughter titled "Letter to a little girl on her first birthday" and an image of her daughter appeared in place of the usual photograph of Josephine on that day.

She was close friends with co-worker Herman Fetzer who went by the penname of Jake Falstaff, and wrote his column "Pippins and Cheese" during the same years Van de Grift worked at the Beacon Journal. Many years after his death, his columns were published into a book of the same namesake "Pippins and Cheese". His desk sat adjacent to Josephine and his column "A Tale O' The Town" began on the same date as Josephine's column in July 1925. He was Josephine's neighbor when he lived at 508 Buchtel Avenue in Akron. Upon her death in 1927, Herman wrote a full front page tribute to Josephine for the Akron Beacon Journal on 23 August 1927, which was reprinted in November of the same year.

== Legacy ==
After spending five weeks in the hospital following an unsuccessful childbirth delivery, she received several blood transfusions in attempts to save her life, Van de Grift died suddenly at the age of 33 in late August 1927, leaving her devoted readers wondering what would become of her 18-month-old daughter, Mary. Hundreds were present at a solemn high mass sung for Josephine, which was the cover story on the front page of the Akron Beacon Journal after her death.

A few years after she died, grade school pupils at the (Samuel) Findley School in Akron formed and created the "Van De Grift Writing Club" in 1930. A photograph naming these 8 students appears in the Akron newspaper in 1930. This writing club was named for Josephine Van De Grift Beacon Journal columnist and writer, who was also an instructor in the school. This writing club continued into the late 1930s with their monthly publication of the Findleyite, which was awarded national honors.

In December 2019, on Christmas Day, author Kristin Carter-Groulx, great-granddaughter of Van de Grift, published a 700 page biographical book about Van de Grift and her column "Demi-Tasse and Mrs. Grundy" including transcribed news articles and photographs from Josephine's collection

== Selected bibliography ==
- The Lonely Road by Josephine Vandegrift. Harvard University Press, 1922.
- Demi-Tasse and Mrs. Grundy by Kristin Carter-Groulx and Josephine Van De Grift. The Tenth Muse Books, 2019.
