= Karl Mey =

German physicist

Karl Mey (March 1879 – May 1945) was a prominent German industrial physicist who directed the research and development branch of Osram AG. His presidency of the Deutsche Physikalische Gesellschaft, starting the year Hitler became Chancellor of Germany, was crucial in that organization's ability to assert its independence from National Socialist policies.

== Education ==
Mey studied physics and mathematics at the Humboldt University of Berlin from 1897. He received his doctorate in 1902 under Emil Warburg; his thesis was on the cathode gradient of alkali metals.

== Career ==
After receipt of his doctorate, Mey was employed at the Militärversuchsamt Tegel and then at the Allgemeine Elektrizitäts-Gesellschaft, where he specialized in research and development of incandescent light bulbs. He became head of the AEG light bulb factory in 1909.

During World War I, from 1914 to 1917, he served in the infantry and saw action at the Western Front.

After the war, Mey was again employed at AEG. After the merger of AEG, the Auer Company, and Siemens & Halske into Osram AG in Berlin, he supervised the whole research and development branch.

Mey was active in a number of professional organizations and held offices in them. Circa 1931, he became vice-chairman of the Deutsche Glastechnische Gesellschaft (German Technical Glass Society). From 1931 to 1945, he was president of the Deutsche Gesellschaft für technische Physik (German Society for Technical Physics). During the period 1933 to 1935, he was the president of the Deutsche Physikalische Gesellschaft (Acronym: DPG; translation: German Physical Society.). With Mey being elected president of the DPG during the year that Adolf Hitler became Chancellor of Germany, as opposed to the Nobel Laureate Johannes Stark, who was a supporter of the anti-Semitic Deutsche Physik, the DPG asserted its independence from slavishly following National Socialist policies.

In May 1945, Mey was arrested by Russian forces as a “leading military industrialist” and deported to the Soviet Union.

== Selected Literature ==
- Karl Mey Über das Kathodengefälle der Alkalimetalle, Annalen der Physik Volume 316, Issue 5, pp. 127–145 (1903)

== Selected Patents ==
- Patent for: Electric lamp. Patent number: 2208998. Filing date: 8 November 1937. Issue date: July 1940. Inventor: Karl Mey. Assignee: General Electric Company, Berlin-Charlottenburg, Germany.

== Bibliography ==
- Hentschel, Klaus, editor and Ann M. Hentschel, editorial assistant and Translator Physics and National Socialism: An Anthology of Primary Sources (Birkhäuser, 1996) ISBN 0-8176-5312-0
- Hoffmann, Dieter Between Autonomy and Accommodation: The German Physical Society during the Third Reich, Physics in Perspective 7(3) 293-329 (2005)
