= The Free Lunch =

2001 novel by Spider Robinson

First edition (publ. Tor Books) Cover art by Stephan Martiniere

The Free Lunch is a 2001 novel by Spider Robinson. The title is a reference to the adage "There ain't no such thing as a free lunch", popularized by science fiction writer Robert A. Heinlein in his 1966 novel The Moon Is a Harsh Mistress.

== Synopsis ==
Twelve-year-old Mike is looking for a safe place to escape from the real world. Like Peter Pan, he seeks a fantastic sanctuary where he can stay without worry. Tomas Immega's amusement park, Dreamland, provides a completely immersive theme park experience, and seems to be just what Mike is looking for. Soon after escaping the guest tracking system, Mike meets Annie, a midget known as the Mother Elf, who has eked out a living in Dreamland for thirteen years caring for the park. Annie takes Mike in, but all is not well in Dreamland.

The story is full of references to other works:

- Callahan's Crosstime Saloon
- Have Space Suit—Will Travel
- "Strawberry Fields Forever"
