= Wolfgang Sandner =

German physicist

Wolfgang Sandner (2 March 1949 in Teisendorf – 5 December 2015) was a German physicist who was employed in atomic and laser physics. From 2010 to 2012 he was president of the German Physical Society. Until his death, he was director general of the ELI Delivery Consortium International Association (AISBL) located in Brussels.

== Biography ==
Sandner studied physics at the University of Freiburg and received his doctorate there in atomic physics. He worked at SRI International in Menlo Park from 1979 to 1981, where he turned to laser spectroscopy. After his habilitation in 1985, he became a professor at the University of Würzburg. In 1991, he became a full-time professor at the University of Tennessee in Knoxville. From 1993 to 2013 he was a director at the Max Born Institute for Nonlinear Optics and Short Pulse Spectroscopy in Berlin-Adlershof and board member of the Research Association Berlin eV From 1994 to 2014 he was also a professor at the TU Berlin. Until his death, he was President and CEO of ELI Delivery Consortium International Association (AISBL), located in Brussels. In this time, he coordinated the construction of the "Extreme Light Infrastructure", an EU large-scale project to build the world's first international laser research facility with locations in the Czech Republic, Hungary and Romania, and prepared before their operation.

Sandner dealt with the interaction of atoms and plasmas with high intensity laser light and the occurring nonlinear phenomena, the study of ionization and the relativistic plasma dynamics, the acceleration of particles with lasers and the development of UV and X-ray lasers (Table Top X-Ray ), lasers for ultrashort pulses of high intensity and the free-electron laser.

Since 1996, he was a Fellow of the American Physical Society. From 2003 to 2013 he was the coordinator of the European network Laserlab Europe, where 30 of the largest European laser research institutions are united from 16 EU Member Equip. Between 2010 and 2012 was president of Sandner German Physical Society. After that, he was the Vice President for two years. In 2014, he was chairman of the Association of European-level Research Infrastructure Facilities (ERF AISBL), an association of large European research institutions. Sandner died on 5 December 2015.
