= Joan Gardner (Broadway actress) =

American actress

Joan Gardner (born Blanche Ovens Clough on March 7, 1903, in Wichita, Sedgwick, Kansas, to Olive Oatman Smith Clough and Jeffrey Bennett Clough Jr. She died April 16, 1972, in Miami, Dade, Florida) was a Broadway actress and chorus girl in the early 20th century. She was known for being in the Ziegfeld Follies as a tall beauty standing at 5 feet 8 inches.

== Biography ==
Gardner was born in Oklahoma in 1903.

Gardner met actress Ina Clare while attending school at the University of Seattle where she was studying stenography and also waiting tables in Spokane, Washington. Clare told Gardner she was a "Follies type" and offered to put in a word with Florenz Ziegfeld. She then went through showgirl training, on how to walk and stand for the Ziegfeld Follies. In the summer 1923, Gardner began performing with the Ziegfeld Follies on Broadway in New York.

One of her first Broadway musicals she had a starring role was Sally, in the fall of 1923, where she played Helen. She also performed on Broadway with Kid Boots: A musical comedy of Palm Beach and golf, starring as Miss Putter/Putty, alongside Eddie Cantor and Mary Eaton.

In New Year's Eve in 1923 New York City, she married Edwin T. Hall (born June 30, 1895, in Chicago, Illinois), a businessman and shoe manufacturer from Boston, Massachusetts. It was a double wedding with another Follies girl, Helen Morgan. Gardner planned to continue stage work after her marriage. In 1924, she gave a candid interview with New York N.E.A. writer Josephine van der Grift describing her time on Broadway and being a stage actress of the times.

Well I got a job in the Follies and I was all excited but the glamour soon left. When you're in the show business you don't have time to meet the people you'd like to meet, you don't get a chance to do the things you'd like to do. Most of the show girls I've met aren't happy. They want to get married and settle down.

On the 1930 census, she is shown living at 328 Church street in Wethersfield, Hartford, Connecticut, with husband Edwin T. and a son John, age 4, born in Boston. In 1940, she is living in Birmingham City, 1376 Villa Rd, Oakland, Michigan with her husband and son. Edwin Tilestone Hall died December 5, 1944, in Portland (Oakland County) Michigan. Joan Gardner Hall died April 16, 1972, in Miami, Florida. Their son John Edwin Hall, born November 27, 1925, operated the Hornpipe kennels (mainly poodles) in Birmingham, Michigan, in the 1950s and 1960s together with his first wife Jean Evalyn McCullen Hall (1914 - February 1999). They later divorced in Florida. In 1985 John E. Hall moved to Newport, Rhode Island, with his second wife Janet. On December 16, 2013, he died from the effects of Alzheimer's disease at age 88.

== Stageography ==
- Kid Boots (1923) as Miss Hughes
- Sally (1923) as Helen
- Ziegfeld Follies 1923 summer edition, as herself
