= Dashun Wang =

Professor of Management and Organizations

- Education: Northeastern University; Fudan University
- Awards: Erdős–Rényi Prize in Network Science
- Scientific career
- Fields: Physics, Science of Science, Computational Social Science, Network Science, Big Data, Complex Systems
- Workplaces: Northwestern University; Pennsylvania State University; Northeastern University
- Doctoral advisor: Albert-László Barabási
- Website: https://www.dashunwang.com/

Dashun Wang is the Kellogg Chair of Technology and a professor of Management and Organizations at the Kellogg School of Management. He serves as the founding director of the Center for Science of Science and Innovation (CSSI) and a founding co-director of the Ryan Institute on Complexity.

In February 2025, Wang became the Founding Faculty Director of the Northwestern Innovation Institute (NI Institute), established by a $25 million gift from Northwestern University trustee Pin Ni and the Future Wanxiang Foundation. The institute uses big data analytics and artificial intelligence to analyze datasets on inventions, patents, licenses, grants, and publications from universities worldwide, with the goal of understanding how breakthroughs emerge in science, business, and technology, and increasing opportunities for groundbreaking innovation.

Wang is a recipient of numerous awards, including the AFOSR Young Investigator award (2016), and was named one of Poets & Quants Best 40 Under 40 Professors (2019).

== Career ==
In 2007, Wang earned an undergraduate degree in physics from Fudan University, Shanghai, China. He then earned both a M.Sc. and a PhD in physics from Northeastern University. From January 2015 to July 2016, he was an assistant professor of College of Information Sciences and Technology at Pennsylvania State University, University Park. He is currently a professor of Management and Organizations at the Kellogg School of Management and the McCormick School of Engineering, at Northwestern University.

== Research ==
Wang studies the science of science, an interdisciplinary field that examines scientific careers and the scientific process. His work on the career paths of individual innovators identifies patterns in scientific careers, including the random impact rule and the hot streak phenomenon.

His study of the organization of innovative activity shows that bigger teams generally advance and improve established concepts, and smaller teams are more often responsible for breakthroughs in science and technology.

Wang's research on failure has led to empirical evidence of the importance of responses to failure at the beginning of careers and a quantitative framework for learning from failure. He has also studied collective dynamics in social networks, human mobility, and long-term scientific impact.

During the COVID-19 pandemic, Wang analyzed global policy responses to the pandemic.

== Awards and honors ==
In 2014, Wang received the Invention Achievement Award from IBM Research. In 2016, Wang was a recipient of the AFOSR Young Investigator award. In 2018, he received an award from the Minerva Research Initiative, a research program sponsored by the U.S. Department of Defense. In 2019, his paper about the impact of the size of scientific teams was one of Altmetric’s Top 100 most discussed papers across all sciences, and he was named one of Poets & Quants Best 40 Under 40 Professors. In 2021, he was awarded the Erdős–Rényi Prize.

== Selected publications ==
=== Books ===
- Dashun Wang and Albert-László Barabási, The Science of Science. (Cambridge University Press, 2021).

=== Articles ===
- Yian Yin, Jian Gao, Benjamin F. Jones, and Dashun Wang (2021), Coevolution of policy and science during the pandemic Science, 2021.
- Yian Yin, Yang Wang, James A. Evans, and Dashun Wang (2019), Quantifying the dynamics of failure across science, startups, and security, Nature.
- Yang Wang, Benjamin F. Jones, and Dashun Wang (2019), Early-Career Setback and Future Career Impact, Nature Communications.
- Lingfei Wu, Dashun Wang, James A. Evans (2019), Large teams develop and small teams disrupt science and technology. Nature, 2019. [Cover Article]
- Ching Jin, Chaoming Song, Johannes Bjelland, Geoffrey Canright, Dashun Wang (2019), Emergence of Scaling in Complex Substitutive Systems. Nature Human Behaviour. [Cover Article]
- Lu Liu, Yang Wang, Roberta Sinatra, C. Lee Giles, Chaoming Song, and Dashun Wang (2018), Hot Streaks in Artistic, Cultural, and Scientific Careers. Nature.
- Tao Jia‡, Dashun Wang, and Boleslaw K. Szymanski. Quantifying patterns of research-interest evolution. Nature Human Behaviour 1 (2017): 0078.
- Roberta Sinatra, Dashun Wang, Pierre Deville, Chaoming Song, and Albert-László Barabási (2016), Quantifying the evolution of individual scientific impact, Science, 354, 6312.
- Pierre Deville, Chaoming Song, Nathan Eagle, Vincent Blondel, Albert-László Barabási, and Dashun Wang (2016), Scaling identity connects human mobility and social interactions. Proceedings of the National Academy of Sciences.
- Dashun Wang, Chaoming Song†, and Albert-László Barabási (2013), Quantifying Longterm Scientific Impact. Science, 342, 6154 (2013): 127–132. [Cover Article]
