= Full-employment theorem =

Theorem implying that no algorithm can optimally perform a task done by humans

In computer science and mathematics, a full employment theorem is a term used, often humorously, to refer to a theorem which states that no algorithm can optimally perform a particular task done by some class of professionals. The name arises because such a theorem ensures that there is endless scope to keep discovering new techniques to improve the way at least some specific task is done.

For example, the full employment theorem for compiler writers states that there is no such thing as a provably perfect size-optimizing compiler, as such a proof for the compiler would have to detect non-terminating computations and reduce them to a one-instruction infinite loop. Thus, the existence of a provably perfect size-optimizing compiler would imply a solution to the halting problem, which cannot exist. This also implies that there may always be a better compiler since the proof that one has the best compiler cannot exist. Therefore, compiler writers will always be able to speculate that they have something to improve. A similar example in practical computer science is the idea of no free lunch in search and optimization, which states that no efficient general-purpose solver can exist, and hence there will always be some particular problem whose best known solution might be improved.

Similarly, Gödel's incompleteness theorems have been called full employment theorems for mathematicians. Tasks such as virus writing and detection, and spam filtering and filter-breaking are also subject to Rice's theorem.
