= Herman Fetzer =

American writer (1899–1935)

- Born: 24 June 1899; Maple Valley, Ohio, U.S.
- Died: 17 January 1935 (aged 35); Cleveland, Ohio, U.S.
- Other name: Jake Falstaff
- Occupation: Writer, Poet
- Spouse: Hazel May "Toni" Stevenson (m. 1922)

Herman Fetzer (24 June 1899 – 17 January 1935), better known as "Jake Falstaff" to Akron Times and Cleveland Press readers, was an American writer and journalist.

== Biography ==
He was born in Maple Valley, Ohio, to Lydia Meyer and Levi E. Fetzer. After graduating from Akron's West High School, he worked as suburban reporter for the Akron Times, where in 1920 he began his column "Pippins and Cheese", taking its title and his pen name from William Shakespeare's Merry Wives of Windsor. Except for a short sabbatical serving as managing editor of the St. Petersburg Times (now the Tampa Bay Times) and head of the Cleveland Plain Dealer's Akron bureau, Fetzer remained with the Times until its merger into the Akron Times-Press. Herman married Hazel May Stevenson on 5 August 1922, in Akron. Together, they had no children. Herman died 17 January 1935, from pneumonia. He is listed in the encyclopaedia of Cleveland History.

== Career ==
He worked briefly for the Akron Beacon Journal and published several books and poetry, two of them based on his Teutonic folk hero, Reini Kugel. While working at the Akron Beacon Journal, his desk sat adjacent to writer Josephine Van De Grift, columnist of Demi-Tasse and Mrs. Grundy. His column "A Tale O' The Town" began on the same date as Josephine's column in July 1925. He was Josephine's neighbor when he lived at 508 Buchtel Avenue in Akron. Upon her death in 1927, Herman wrote a full front page tribute to Josephine for the Akron Beacon Journal on 23 August 1927, which was reprinted in November of the same year. His newest column "Afternoons Around Akron" appeared also that year.

Fetzer's reputation spread as he published articles, poems, and stories in The New Yorker, The Nation, Collier's, and Liberty. In the summers of 1929 and 1930, he wrote the Conning Tower column for the vacationing Franklin Pierce Adams in the New York World. Lured to the Cleveland Press early in 1930, Fetzer not only contributed "Pippins and Cheese" (which included the first use of the phrase "There is no such thing as free lunch") but also did rewrites, editorials, and features until his early death from lung cancer. Largely through the efforts of his widow, Hazel, several volumes of his work were published posthumously: The Bulls of Spring: Selected Poems (1937); 3 volumes of Ohio farm stories culled from a "Rural Vacation" series composed for the Press; a representative Fetzer anthology, Pippins and Cheese (1960); and Jake Falstaff Selections to Make You Thirsty (1969).

An inventory of his works is held in a repository at the University of Akron. The collection consists of manuscripts, correspondence, newspaper clippings, photographs and miscellaneous material concerning Fetzer's life and work as a newspaper man and writer. After Fetzer's death, his wife, Hazel "Toni" Fetzer and a New York agent, Sally Harrison, edited his poetry and prose.

Upon his death in 1935, The Akron Beacon Journal published a cover story and a photo of him at his writing desk.

== Selected bibliography ==
- The Big Snow, Christmas at Jacoby's Corners. Boston, Houghton Mifflin company.
- The Book of Rabelais. Garden City, N.Y., Doubleday, Doran & company, inc., 1928.
- The Bulls of Spring: The Selected Poems of Jake Falstaff. New York, G.P. Putnam's Sons, 1937.
- Come Back to Wayne County. Boston, Houghton Mifflin company.
- Jacoby's Corners. Boston, Houghton Mifflin company.
- Reini Kugel: Lover of this Earth. Garden City, N.Y., Doubleday, Doran, 1929.
- Pippins and Cheese. Brookside Press, 1960.
