= Roberta Sinatra =

Computer and data scientist

- Education: University of Catania
- Scientific career
- Thesis: High-order markov chains in complex networks: models and applications (2012)

Roberta Sinatra is an Italian scientist and associate professor at the IT University of Copenhagen. She is known for her work in network science and conducts research on quantifying success in science.

== Early life and education ==
Sinatra received her undergraduate degree from the University of Catania in 2005. She received her M.Sc. in theoretical physics from the same university in 2007 and, in 2008, an M.Sc. (Eccellenza Specialistica) from the Scuola superiore di Catania. She went on to earn a Ph.D in physics from the University of Catania in 2012, working with Vito Latora and Jesús Gómez-Gardeñes. She then held postdoctoral and associate research scientist positions at Northeastern University and Dana Farber Cancer Institute. She joined IT University of Copenhagen in 2019.

== Research and career ==
Sinatra is known for her research on the social determinants of success, using large-scale data sets and methods from statistical physics, machine learning and network science. Her early work was on cooperation in games. She has subsequently quantified performance and success in scientific and creative careers, as well as in art and culture. Through her research, she addressed gender inequality in academic publishing and the importance of luck in success.

== Selected publications ==
- Fortunato, Santo; Bergstrom, Carl T.; Börner, Katy; Evans, James A.; Helbing, Dirk; Milojević, Staša; Petersen, Alexander M.; Radicchi, Filippo; Sinatra, Roberta; Uzzi, Brian; Vespignani, Alessandro (March 2, 2018). "Science of science". Science. 359 (6379) eaao0185. doi:10.1126/science.aao0185. PMC 5949209. PMID 29496846.
- Huang, Junming; Gates, Alexander J.; Sinatra, Roberta; Barabási, Albert-László (March 3, 2020). "Historical comparison of gender inequality in scientific careers across countries and disciplines". Proceedings of the National Academy of Sciences. 117 (9): 4609–4616. Bibcode:2020PNAS..117.4609H. doi:10.1073/pnas.1914221117. ISSN 0027-8424. PMC 7060730. PMID 32071248.
- Sinatra, Roberta; Wang, Dashun; Deville, Pierre; Song, Chaoming; Barabási, Albert-László (November 4, 2016). "Quantifying the evolution of individual scientific impact". Science. 354 (6312) aaf5239. doi:10.1126/science.aaf5239. PMID 27811240. S2CID 24015860.
- Sinatra, R; Iranzo, J; Gómez-Gardeñes, J; Floría, L M; Latora, V; Moreno, Y (September 21, 2009). "The Ultimatum Game in complex networks". Journal of Statistical Mechanics: Theory and Experiment. 2009 (9) P09012. arXiv:0807.0750. Bibcode:2009JSMTE..09..012S. doi:10.1088/1742-5468/2009/09/p09012. ISSN 1742-5468. S2CID 15069048.
- Sinatra, Roberta; Deville, Pierre; Szell, Michael; Wang, Dashun; Barabási, Albert-László (2015). "A century of physics". Nature Physics. 11 (10): 791–796. Bibcode:2015NatPh..11..791S. doi:10.1038/nphys3494. ISSN 1745-2473. S2CID 10078155.

== Awards and honors ==
In 2017 she was named a fellow of the Institute for Scientific Interchange. In 2020 Sinatra received a Junior Scientific Award from the Complex System Society, for "pioneer contributions to the science of science and success, having had an impact in multiple fields, from network science to computational social science and scientometrics".
