= Akron Beacon Journal =

American daily newspaper

- The March 2, 2007 front page of the Akron Beacon Journal
- Type: Daily newspaper
- Format: Broadsheet
- Owner: USA Today Co.
- Publisher: Bill Albrecht
- Editor: Cheryl Powell
- Founded: 1839; 187 years ago (as the Summit Beacon)
- Headquarters: 388 South Main Street; Akron, Ohio; US
- Circulation: 21,947 Daily; 34,841 Sunday; (as of 2022)
- Website: beaconjournal.com

The Akron Beacon Journal is a morning newspaper in Akron, Ohio, United States. Owned by Gannett, it is the sole daily newspaper in Akron and is distributed throughout Northeast Ohio. The paper's coverage focuses on local news. The Beacon Journal has won four Pulitzer Prizes: in 1968, 1971, 1987 and 1994.

== History ==
The paper was founded with the 1897 merger of the Summit Beacon, first published in 1839, and the Akron Evening Journal, founded in 1896. In 1903, the Beacon Journal was purchased by Charles Landon Knight. His son John S. Knight inherited the paper, in 1933, on Charles' death. The Beacon Journal under Knight was the original and flagship newspaper of Knight Newspaper Company, later called Knight Ridder.

The McClatchy Company bought Knight Ridder in June 2006 with intentions of selling 12 Knight Ridder newspapers. On August 2, 2006, McClatchy sold the Beacon Journal to Black Press. In 2018, GateHouse Media bought the newspaper.

On November 11, 2013, the Akron Beacon Journal printed its last paper in-house. It subsequently used the presses at The Repository in Canton, Ohio, also owned by GateHouse. As of March 2019 it was using the presses at The Plain Dealer in Cleveland.

The Akron Beacon Journal is Summit County's oldest continuously operating business.

== Notable journalists ==
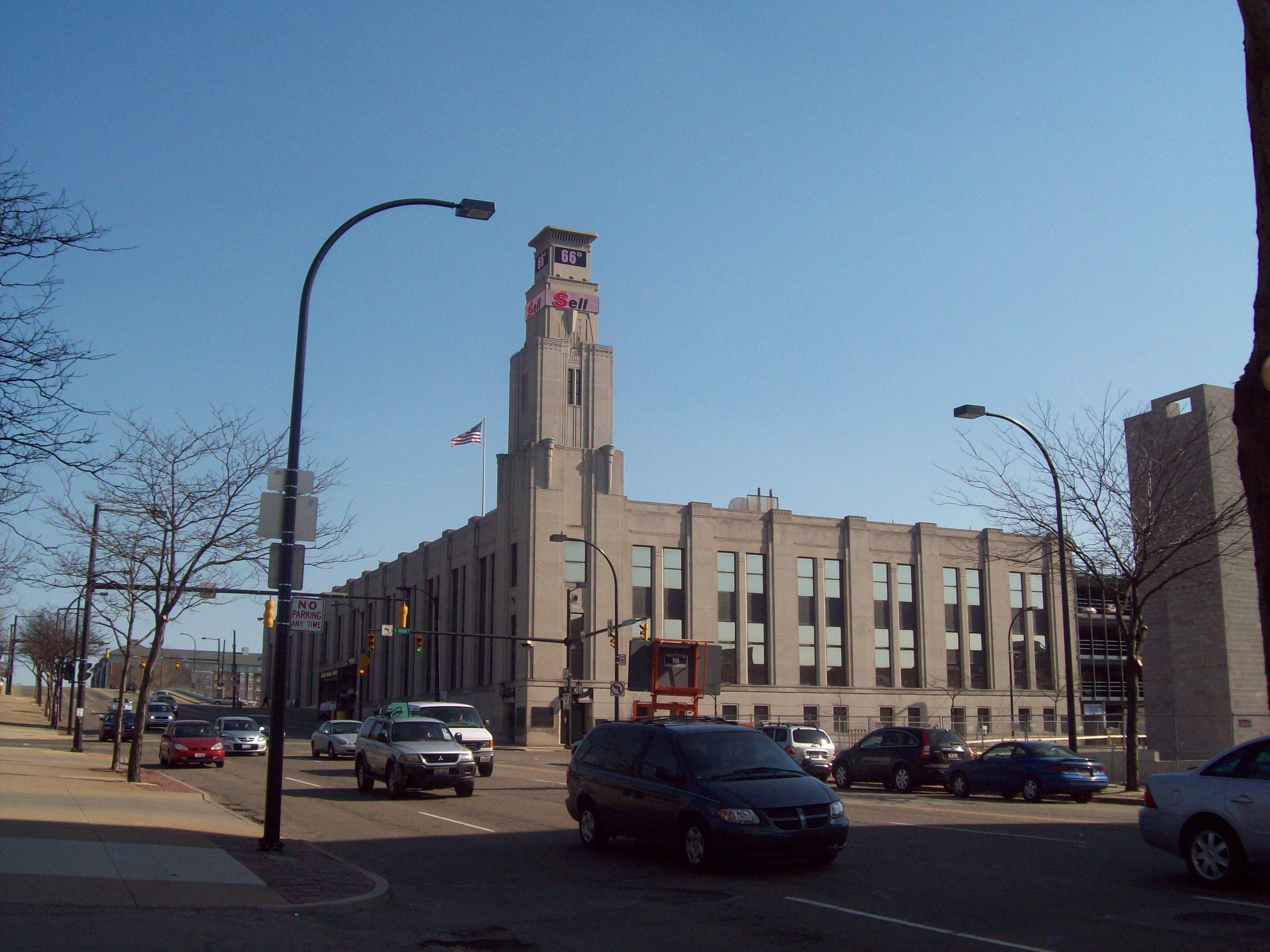
Headquarters from 1938 to 2019

- Herman Fetzer: better known as "Jake Falstaff" to the Akron Beacon Journal, Akron Times and Cleveland Press readers, worked as suburban reporter for the Akron Times, where in 1920 he began his column Pippins and Cheese, taking its title and his pen name from William Shakespeare's Merry Wives of Windsor. While working at the Akron Beacon Journal, his desk sat adjacent to that of writer Josephine Van De Grift, columnist of Demi-Tasse and Mrs. Grundy..
- Sheldon Ocker: Covered the Cleveland Indians for the Beacon Journal. Received the 2018 J. G. Taylor Spink Award; inducted him into the National Baseball Hall of Fame.
- Terry Pluto: recognized as NSSA Ohio Sportswriter of the year multiple times. Wrote more than 20 books, mostly about Northeast Ohio sports.
- Josephine Van De Grift, early 20th century newspaperwoman with the Newspaper Enterprise Association and daily columnist for the Akron Beacon Journal with Demi-Tasse and Mrs. Grundy.

== Awards ==
The paper has won four Pulitzer Prizes:

- 1968 Pulitzer Prize for Editorial Writing (John S. Knight) for Vietnam War weekly notebook columns
- 1971 Pulitzer Prize for General Local Reporting for coverage of Kent State Shootings
- 1987 Pulitzer Prize for General News Reporting for coverage of potential Goodyear takeover: "The Goodyear War"
- 1994 Pulitzer Prize for Public Service for race relations series: "A Question of Color"
