= Jesús Gómez-Gardeñes =

Spanish physicist

- Born: Spain
- Education: University of Zaragoza (Ph.D)
- Occupation: Physicist

Jesús Gómez-Gardeñes is a Spanish physicist, currently Full Professor (Professor Catedrático) in Condensed Matter Physics at the University of Zaragoza (Spain). He is known for his works on complex systems, in particular on the structure and dynamics of complex networks.

== Academic career ==
Gomez-Gardeñes received a PhD in physics from the University of Zaragoza in Spain, with a thesis entitled "Complex Systems: Nonlinearity and Structural Complexity in spatially extended and discrete systems.” After completing his PhD, he conducted postdoctoral research first at the Scuola Superiore di Catania (Italy) in the group of Vito Latora, and then in the group of Alex Arenas at the University Rovira i Virgili (Spain). After his postdoctoral period, he joined in 2009 the King Juan Carlos University in Madrid as Lecturer, before returning in 2011 to his alma mater as a Ramón y Cajal fellow. Between 2019 and 2022 Jesús Gómez-Gardeñes was Associate Professor (Professor Titular), whereas since 2023 he is Full Professor (Professor Catedrático) in Condensed Matter Physics. He leads the Group Of Theoretical and Applied Modeling (GOTHAM lab) at the Institute of Biocomputation and Physics of Complex Systems.

As of July 2020, he is author of more than 120 scientific articles published in peer-reviewed journals. His h-index is equal to 51 according to Google Scholar. His work has been featured in many venues, including being highlighted on the cover of journals like Nature Human Behaviour (issue of February 2017), and Nature Physics (issue of January 2018) for two works that were selected among the most relevant published by the journal Nature during the first 20 years of network science.

== Research ==
After some initial work in the field of theoretical condensed matter physics, the scientific contributions of Gómez-Gardeñes have focused on the application of statistical physics methods to the study of complex systems, making him one of the major contributors in the network science's area of study. Within the latter, he has developed several approaches to investigate the structure and dynamics of networks, in particular to multidimensional networks. His contributions span a wide range of disciplines ranging from mathematical epidemiology, synchronization, and social science.

Gómez-Gardeñes is well known for his works on the mathematical formulation of multi-scale metapopulation models to integrate human mobility and interaction data on realistic epidemiological frameworks. More specifically, he has studied the spatio-temporal evolution of epidemics, and the evaluation of contention measures. Such a method has been applied to analyze the diffusion of endemic diseases such as the Dengue fever in Colombia, as well as the diffusion of emergent diseases such as COVID-19 in Spain and Colombia.

Within the domain of social science, Gómez-Gardeñes is known for his studies on evolutionary game theory and human cooperation and, in particular, for the use of network science tools to analyze human populations, going from large cities to small hunter-gatherers societies. Finally, he is also known in the field of synchronization theory where he has introduced several approaches to characterize the transition towards dynamical coherence in the Kuramoto model. In particular, his main achievements include the identification of the mechanism to obtain explosive synchronization transitions in populations of oscillators whose interactions are encoded as a network; and the generalization of the Master Stability Function to the case of interactions encoded as multiplex networks.

== Awards and achievements ==
In 2007, Gómez-Gardeñes was awarded with the Investigador Novel Prize by the Spanish Royal Physics Society for his works on the structure and dynamics of complex networks.

Gómez-Gardeñes has been visiting researcher at the Los Alamos National Laboratory in New Mexico (USA), Weizmann Institute of Science (Israel), distinguished visiting professor of the National Council for Scientific and Technological Development (CNPq) in Brazil, and distinguished visitor of the Scottish Universities Physics Alliance (SUPA). In 2019, Gómez-Gardeñes was appointed as Fellow of the Institute for Computational Social Science of the University of Kobe (Japan).

He is chair and founder of the Latin American Conference of Complex Networks (LANET), an international conference aimed at spurring the field of network science in the Latin American community. Moreover, he serves since 2013 as associated editor of the Journal of Complex Networks (Oxford University Press), and also as a member of the editorial board of Journal of Physics: Complexity, a scientific journal published by the Institute of Physics.
