= Free lunch =

Provision of a meal at no cost, usually as a sales enticement to attract customers

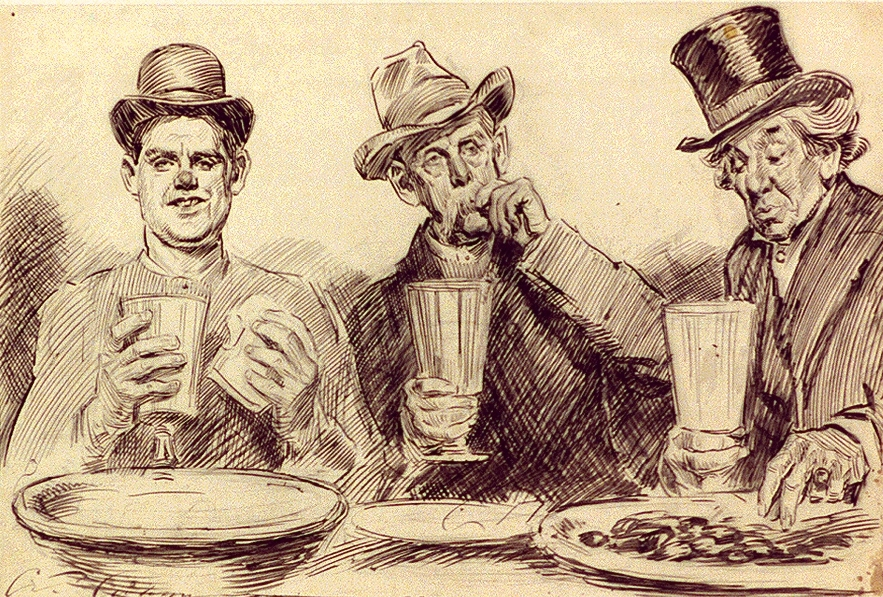
"Free lunch", a 1911 illustration by Charles Dana Gibson

A free lunch is the provision of a meal at no cost, usually as a sales enticement to attract customers and increase revenues from other business. The practice was once common in saloons and taverns in many places in the United States, with the phrase appearing frequently in U.S. literature from about 1870 to the late 1920s. These establishments included a "free" lunch, which varied from rudimentary to quite elaborate, with the purchase of at least one drink. These free lunches were typically worth more than the price of a single drink. The saloon-keeper relied on the expectation that most customers would buy more than one drink, and that the practice would build patronage for other times of day.

In the United States, the financial hardships of the Great Depression marked the virtual end of the free lunch for economic reasons, and it never really returned. Today, many taverns and lounges offer free food during happy hour, along with low-priced drinks and other menu items. Free or lower priced food and drink is frequently supplied by gambling establishments such as casinos.

The concept of a free lunch is critiqued in the phrase "no such thing as a free lunch", popularized in part by authors such as Robert A. Heinlein and Milton Friedman.

== History ==
In 1875, The New York Times wrote of elaborate free lunches as a "custom peculiar to the Crescent City" (New Orleans): "In every one of the drinking saloons which fill the city a meal of some sort is served free every day. The custom appears to have prevailed long before the war .... I am informed that there are thousands of men in this city who live entirely on the meals obtained in this way." As described by this reporter,

A free lunch-counter is a great leveler of classes, and when a man takes up a position before one of them he must give up all hope of appearing either dignified or consequential. In New-Orleans all classes of the people can be seen partaking of these free meals and pushing and scrambling to be helped a second time. [At one saloon] six men were engaged in preparing drinks for the crowd that stood in front of the counter. I noticed that the price charged for every kind of liquor was fifteen cents, punches and cobblers costing no more than a glass of ale.

The repast included "immense dishes of butter", "large baskets of bread", "a monster silver boiler filled with a most excellent oyster soup", "a round of beef that must have weighed at least forty pounds", "vessels filled with potatoes, stewed mutton, stewed tomatoes, and macaroni à la Français". The proprietor said the patrons included "at least a dozen old fellows who come here every day, take one fifteen cent drink, eat a dinner which would have cost them $1 in a restaurant, and then complain that the beef is tough or the potatoes watery". $0.15 in 1875 is equivalent to $4.40 in 2025. $1 in 1875 is equivalent to $29.32 in 2025.

== Fiends ==
The nearly indigent "free lunch fiend" was a recognized social type. An 1872 New York Times story about "loafers and free-lunch men" who "toil not, neither do they spin, yet they 'get along'", visiting saloons, trying to bum drinks from strangers: "Should this inexplicable lunch-fiend not happen to be called to drink, he devours whatever he can, and, while the bartender is occupied, tries to escape unnoticed."

In American saloon bars from the late 19th century until Prohibition, bouncers had, in addition to their role of removing drunks who were too intoxicated to keep buying drinks, fighters, and troublemakers, the role of protecting the saloon's free buffet. To attract business, "... many saloons lured customers with offers of a "free lunch"—usually well salted to inspire drinking, and the saloon "bouncer" was generally on hand to discourage [those with too] hearty appetites".

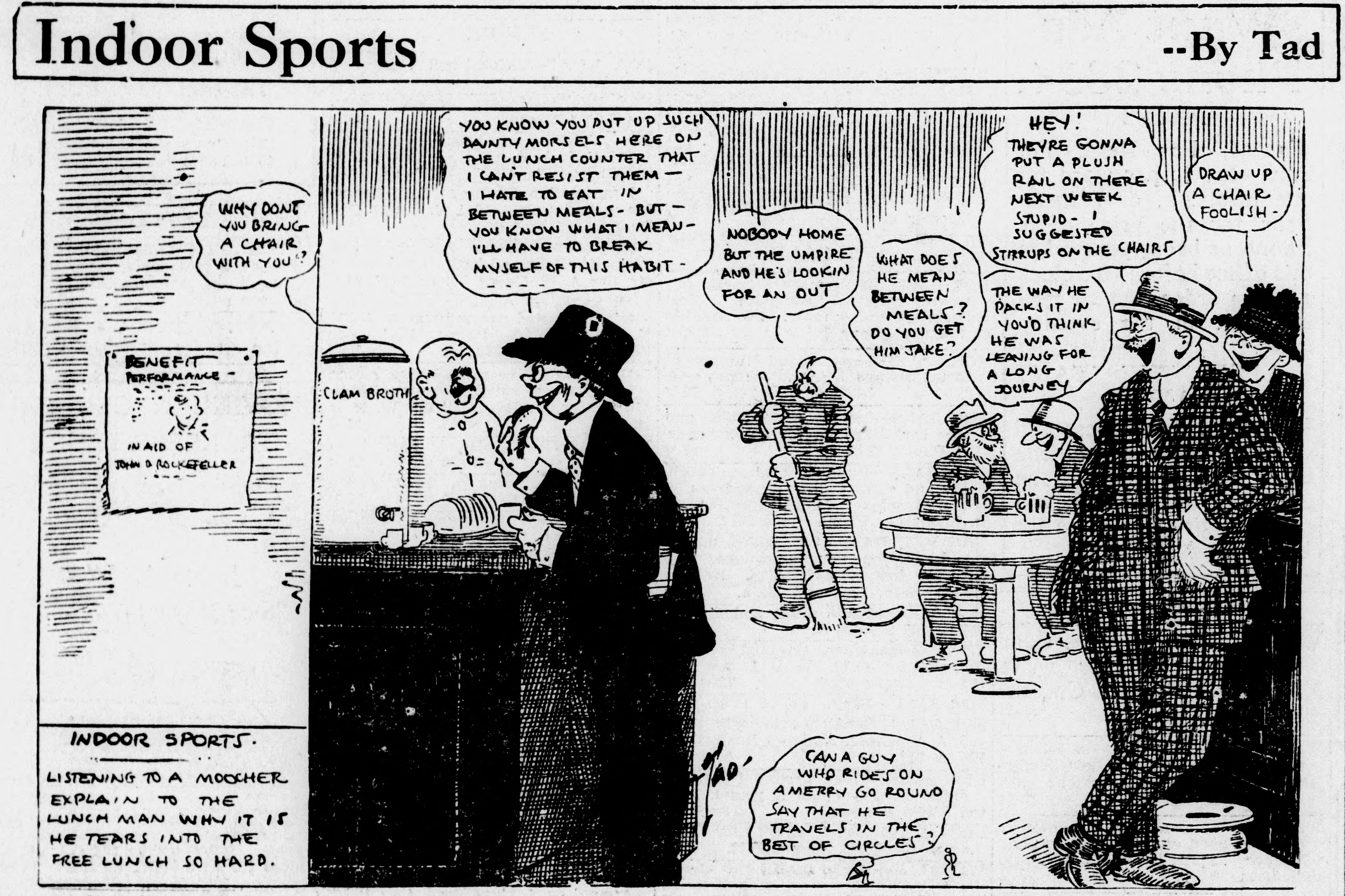
Tad Dorgan's comic strip Indoor Sports, from March 1, 1916, depicting a man who constantly eats the free lunch.

The custom was well-developed in San Francisco. An 1886 story on the fading of the days of the 1849 California Gold Rush calls the free lunch fiend the "only landmark of the past". It asks "how do all these idle people live" and asserts: "It is the free lunch system that keeps them alive. Take away that peculiarly California institution and they would all starve." Rudyard Kipling, writing in 1891, noted how he

came upon a barroom full of bad Salon pictures in which men with hats on the backs of their heads were wolfing food from a counter. It was the institution of the "free lunch" I had struck. You paid for a drink and got as much as you wanted to eat. For something less than a rupee a day a man can feed himself sumptuously in San Francisco, even though he be a bankrupt. Remember this if ever you are stranded in these parts.

A 1919 novel compared a war zone to the free lunch experience, by saying "the shells and shrapnels was flyin round and over our heads thicker than hungry bums around a free lunch counter".

== Controversies ==
The temperance movement opposed the free lunch as promoting the consumption of alcohol. An 1874 history of the movement writes:

In the cities, there are prominent rooms on fashionable streets that hold out the sign "Free Lunch." Does it mean that some [philanthropist] ... has gone systematically to work setting out tables ... placing about them a score of the most beautiful and winning young ladies ... hiring a band of music? Ah, no! ... there are men who do all this in order to hide the main feature of their peculiar institution. Out of sight is a well-filled bar, which is the centre about which all these other things are made to revolve. All the gathered fascinations and attractions are as so many baits to allure men into the net that is spread for them. Thus consummate art plies the work of death, and virtue, reputation, and every good are sacrificed at these worse than Moloch shrines.

Reformer William T. Stead suggested that the free lunch performed a social relief function. He commented that in winter in 1894 the suffering of the poor in need of food

"would have been very much greater had it not been for the help given by the labor unions to their members and for an agency which, without pretending to be of much account from a charitable point of view, nevertheless fed more hungry people in Chicago than all the other agencies, religious, charitable, and municipal, put together. I refer to the Free Lunch of the saloons. There are from six to seven thousand saloons in Chicago. In one half of these a free lunch is provided every day of the week."

He stated that "in many cases the free lunch is really a free lunch", citing an example of a saloon which did not insist on a drink purchase, although commenting that this saloon was "better than its neighbors". Stead cites a newspaper's estimate that the saloon keepers fed 60,000 people a day and that this represented a contribution of about $18,000 a week toward the relief of the destitute in Chicago.

In 1896, the New York State legislature passed the Raines law which was intended to regulate liquor traffic. Among its many provisions, one forbade the sale of liquor unless accompanied by food. Another outlawed the free lunch. In 1897, it was amended to allow free lunches again.
