= Advances in Complex Systems =

- Discipline: multidisciplinary
- Language: English
- Edited by: Márton Karsai (since 2023)

Publication details
- History: 1998–present
- Publisher: World Scientific (Singapore)

Standard abbreviations
- ISO 4: Adv. Complex Syst.

Indexing
- ISSN: 0219-5259 (print); 1793-6802 (web)

Links
- Journal homepage

Advances in Complex Systems (ACS) is a peer-reviewed journal published quarterly by World Scientific providing a multidisciplinary perspective to the study of complex systems. The journal was founded in 1997 and aims to "promote cross-fertilization of ideas among all the scientific disciplines having to deal with their own complex systems".

Papers in ACS are divided into five sections, each managed by a separate editor: Physics and Mathematics; Computer Sciences; Biological Systems; Social and Economic Systems; and Traffic and Environmental Systems.

== Abstracting and indexing ==
The journal is indexed in Mathematical Reviews, CSA Human Population and the Environment Abstracts, CSA Risk Abstracts, Zentralblatt MATH, Science Citation Index Expanded, CompuMath Citation Index, Current Contents/Physical, Chemical & Earth Sciences, ISI Alerting Services, and Inspec.
