= Institute for Biocomputation and Physics of Complex Systems =

Spanish university research center

- Established: 8 October 2002
- Location: Zaragoza, Aragón, Spain
- Website: bifi.es

The Institute for Biocomputation and Physics of Complex Systems (BIFI) is a research center of the University of Zaragoza devoted to the study of complex systems from a multidisciplinary perspective. Biochemists, physicists, mathematicians, computer scientists, and researchers from other fields study complex systems, as well as different phenomena and processes related to them (protein folding, interaction between diseases, the spread of epidemics, multi-layer networks, collective social phenomena, etc.). The ultimate goal is to unravel various aspects of complexity, promote basic science, and assess the impact of applied research and possible benefits for society.

== History ==
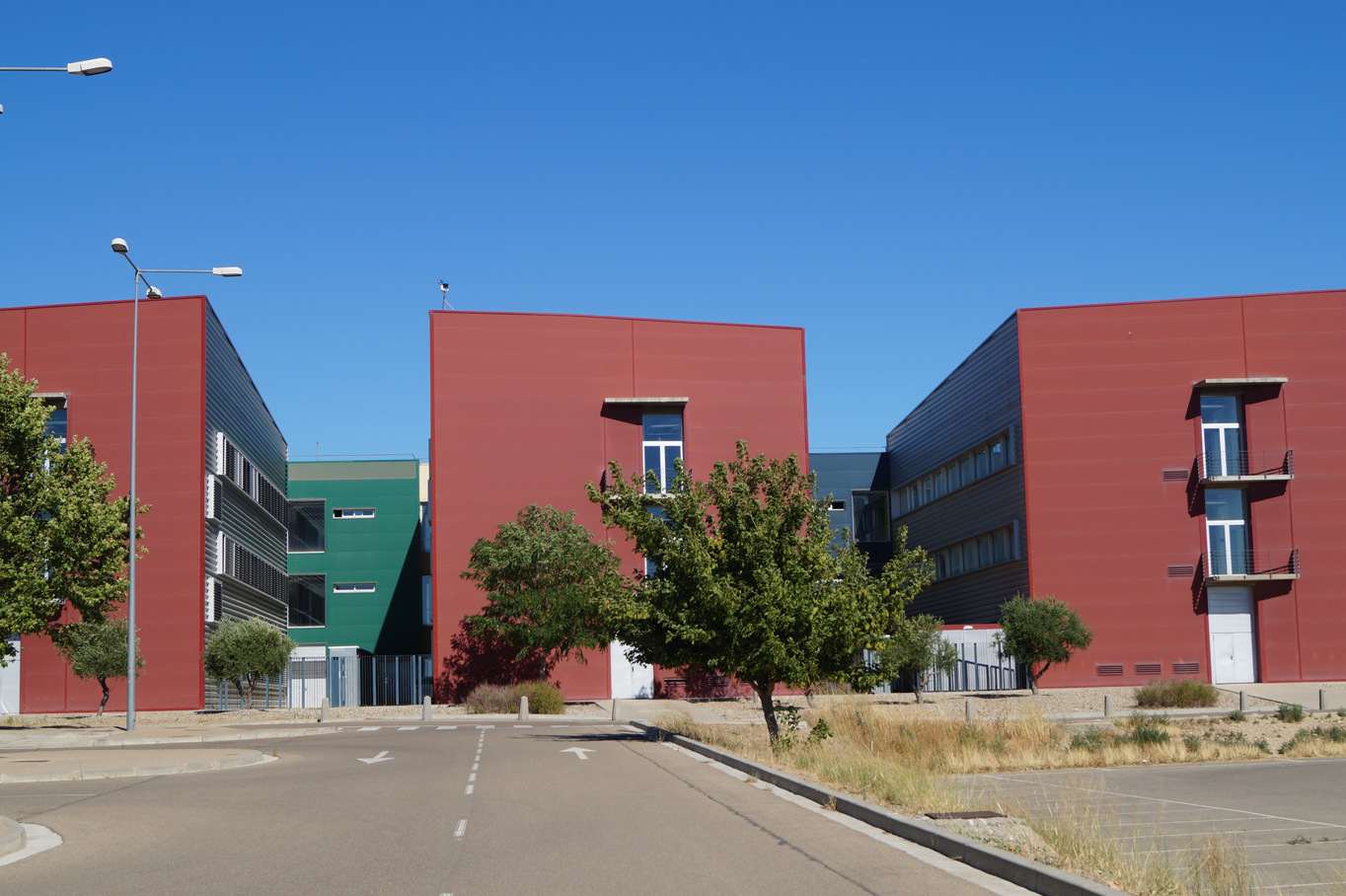
Edificio I + D, Zaragoza

The BIFI Institute was founded in October 2002 by a group of professors from the Faculty of Sciences of the University of Zaragoza, from the departments of theoretical physics, condensed matter physics, biochemistry, and molecular biology. Its first director was the mathematician, José Félix Sáenz Lorenzo (2002–2011).

From November 2003 to 2010, the institute was located in the Cervantes Building in Corona de Aragón 42, Zaragoza. In October 2006, BIFI joined the Spanish Supercomputing Network hosting the supercomputer CaesarAugusta (supercomputer). This node became operational at the end of 2007.

In 2010, BIFI moved its facilities to the I+D+i Building, located at the Rio Ebro Campus of the University of Zaragoza, in the Actur district. The building was specifically designed to host the research institutes of the University of Zaragoza (UNIZAR). Currently, in addition to BIFI, the building hosts the Institute of Nanoscience of Aragon (INA), the Aragon Institute for Engineering Research (I3A) and the Zaragoza Scientific Center for Advanced Modeling (ZCAM).

== Research lines ==
The research developed at the BIFI Institute is divided into four macro-areas:

- Biochemistry and molecular and cellular biology (MCB)
- Biophysics
- Computing
- Physics

The fundamental objectives of BIFI are: to achieve research excellence, to transfer fundamental knowledge, to promote innovatin,n and to train a new generation of young scientists in the use of techniques and methods from different disciplines. BIFI also fosters an open and innovative scientific culture and the development of a wide network of collaborations with prestigious institutions at national and international levels.

The science of the 21st century has a strong multidisciplinary character and the analysis of complex systems based on the holistic principle that "the whole is more than the sum of its parts" is the essence and the starting point of the institute's research.

The institute's activities also include the organization of seminars and national and international congresses. In recent years, it has achieved a strong institutional presence and an increasing number of collaborations established with the business world.

== Infrastructure ==
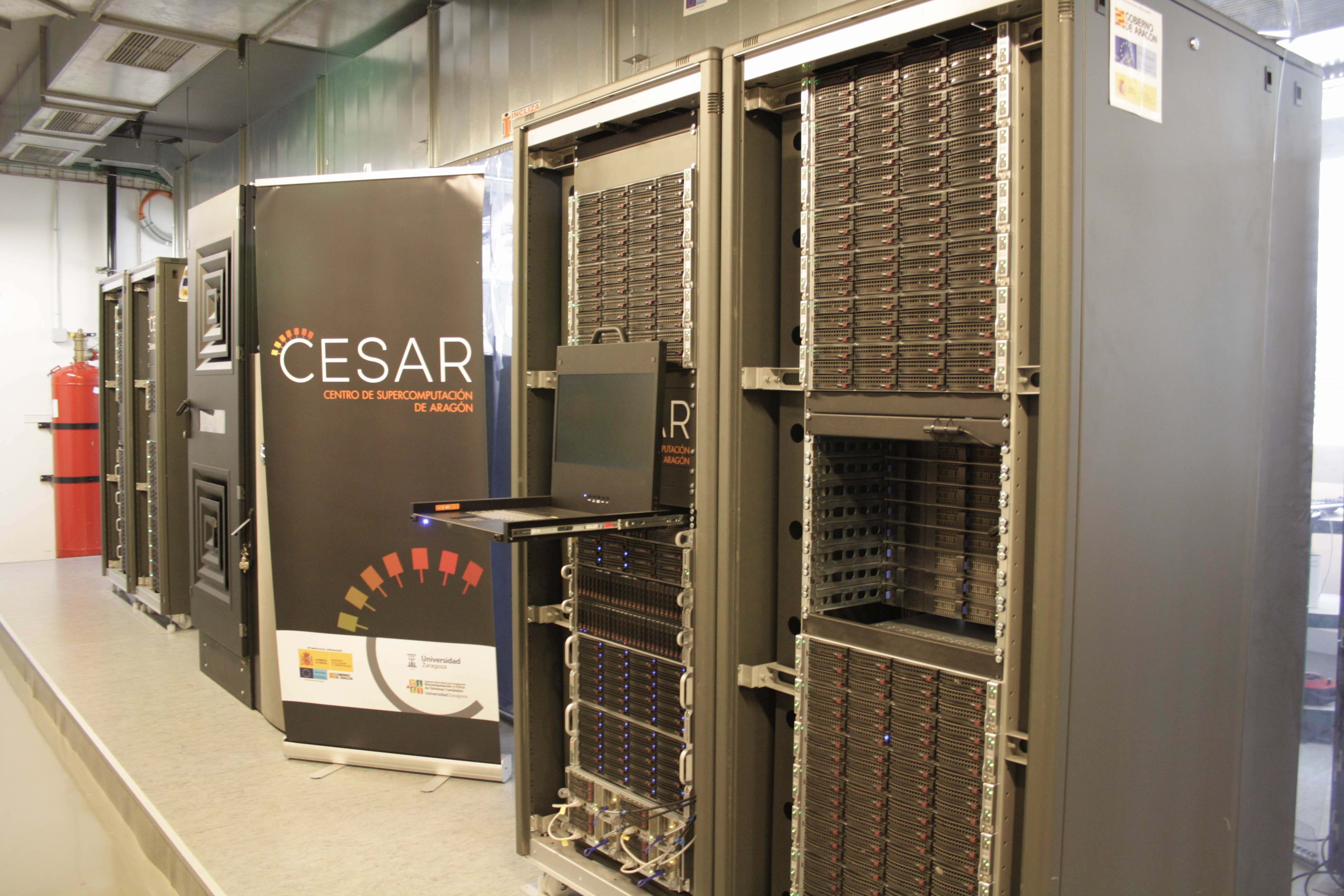
Supercomputing laboratory.

The Supercomputing Laboratory hosts most of its computing resources: The powerful "Terminus" cluster, nodes in European projects related to grid computing technologies, massive storage servers, an openSUSE repository, etc. BIFI operates Caesaraugusta, a supercomputer with 3,072 cores and 25 TFLOPs, which is the current node of Aragon in the Spanish Supercomputing Network. This computing infrastructure is supplemented by more than 10,000 volunteer computing cores (the Ibercivis project) and two special-purpose machines (JANUS I and JANUS II) devoted to material science calculations that are equivalent to several thousand cores. Finally, the Aragon Supercomputing Center CESAR has been recently opened, which adds state-of-the-art computing facilities to provide service to many end-users in the autonomous region.

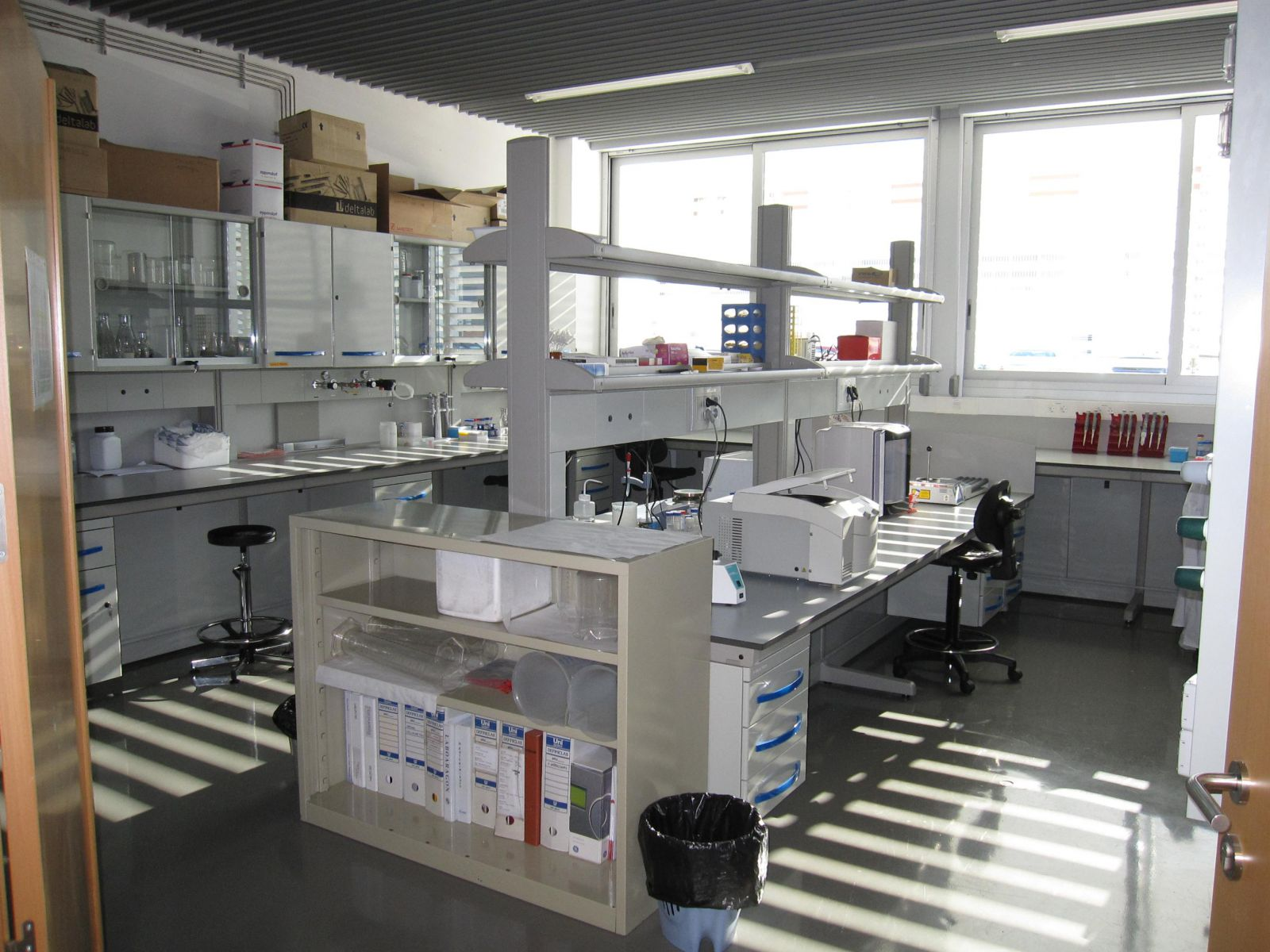
Biochemistry laboratory.

The biochemistry and crystallography laboratories also have important resources and state-of-the-art equipment for different scientific tasks in the areas of biochemistry and biophysics.

- Leica DMI 6000B: a multidimensional microscopy system with structured light (Optigrid) and MMAF (Metamorph) analysis software
- VP-ITC: isothermal titration calorimeter for the determination of reaction heat in physico-chemical processes
- FluoDíaT70: a thermostated fluorescence plate reader
- Biacore T200: an analysis system based on the phenomenon of surface plasmon resonance (SPR) to monitor the interaction between molecules in real time, etc.

In the area of socio-physics, different experiments (onsite and online) to study human behavior are conducted by BIFI members. The main purpose is to analyze the behavioral rules and mechanisms that promote the emergence of cooperation in humans. Through the simulation of increasingly realistic scenarios, important conclusions on how individuals behave when dealing with certain social dilemmas like climate change are also drawn. The results of these studies eventually allow policy-makers and governmental institutions to evaluate and redesign economic, soci,al and cooperation policies more efficiently. For this purpose, it has its own software and a pool of more than 6000 volunteers (Nectunt).

== See also ==
- University of Zaragoza
