= No such thing as a free lunch =

Adage of the impossibility of getting something for nothing

The Libersign, a political emblem of the U.S. Libertarian Party during the 1970s, features an arrow diagonally crossing the letters "TANSTAAFL".

"No such thing as a free lunch", also written as "There ain't no such thing as a free lunch", "There is no such thing as a free lunch" or simply "No free lunch" and sometimes called Crane's law, is a popular adage communicating the idea that it is impossible to get something for nothing. The acronyms TANSTAAFL, TINSTAAFL, and TNSTAAFL are also used. The phrase was in use by the 1930s, but its first appearance is unknown. The "free lunch" in the saying refers to the formerly common practice in American bars of offering a "free lunch" in order to entice drinking customers.

The phrase and the acronym are central to Robert A. Heinlein's 1966 science-fiction novel The Moon is a Harsh Mistress, which helped popularize it. The free-market economist Milton Friedman also increased its exposure and use. as he paraphrased it as the title of a 1975 book; it is used in economics literature to describe opportunity cost. Campbell McConnell writes that the idea is "at the core of economics".

== History ==
=== "Free lunch" ===
The "free lunch" refers to the once-common tradition of saloons in the United States providing a "free" lunch to patrons who had purchased at least one drink. Many foods on offer were high in salt (e.g., ham, cheese, and salted crackers), so those who ate them ended up feeling thirsty and buying more beer.

Some quotes exist from the time, arguing that these free lunches were not really free, such as in the Columbia Daily Phoenix of 1873: "One of the most expensive things in this city—Free lunch.", L. A. W. Bulletin 1897: "If no one ever paid for drinks, there would be no 'free lunch', and the man who confines his attention to the free lunch, alone, is getting what he knows others pay for." and the Washington Herald 1909: "as a matter of fact, there is no such thing as free lunch. Somebody has to pay for it." When Chicago attempted to ban free lunches in 1917, Michael Montague, a saloon owner, made the case that "There is no such thing as free lunch. First of all, you have to buy something from the saloonkeeper before you can partake of the lunch. Lunch is the greatest tempering influence in the saloon. If a man takes a two-ounce drink of whisky and then takes a bite of lunch, he probably does not take a second drink. Whisky taken alone creates an appetite. If you want to create the use of whisky, pass this ordinance."

On the other hand, TANSTAAFL applies this more generally, and indicates an acknowledgement that in reality a person or a society cannot get "something for nothing". Even if something appears to be free, there is always a cost to the person or to society as a whole, although that may be a hidden cost or an externality. For example, as Heinlein has one of his characters point out, a bar offering a free lunch will likely charge more for its drinks.

=== Early uses ===
TANSTAAFL: a plan for a new economic world order by Pierre Dos Utt (1949)

The earliest known use of the phrase in its current sense is as the punchline of the story "Economics in Eight Words" in Herman Fetzer's "Pippins and Cheese" column in The Cleveland Press on May 4, 1933. The story is a fable about a king who hired four hundred economists to write an outline of economics. When they told him the outline would consist of four hundred volumes, he executed half of them, and continued doing this each year until only the chief economist survived, and made his summary in eight words: "There is no such thing as free lunch."

"Economics in Eight Words" was rewritten by newspaper editor Walter Morrow, and published under the same title in The Birmingham Post on June 24, 1938, and other Scripps-Howard newspapers around that time. While it followed the same outline as Fetzer's story, Morrow changed the final line to "There ain't no such thing as free lunch."

In 1942, "There ain't no such thing as a free lunch" (with the word "a" before "free lunch") appeared in Public Utilities Fortnightly, and the Columbia Law Review in 1945. A shortened version of the phrase, "there is no free lunch" appeared in a 1942 article in the Oelwein Daily Register (in a quote attributed to economist Harley L. Lutz) and in a 1947 column by economist Merryle S. Rukeyser.

In 1949, the phrase appeared in Pierre Dos Utt's monograph TANSTAAFL: A Plan for a New Economic World Order, which describes an oligarchic political system based on his conclusions from "no free lunch" principles. In 1950, a New York Times columnist ascribed the phrase to economist (and army general) Leonard P. Ayres of the Cleveland Trust Company: "It seems that shortly before the General's death [in 1946]... a group of reporters approached the general with the request that perhaps he might give them one of several immutable economic truisms that he had gathered from his long years of economic study... 'It is an immutable economic fact,' said the general, 'that there is no such thing as a free lunch.'"

The September 8, 1961, issue of LIFE magazine has an editorial on page 4, "'TANSTAFL', It's the Truth", that closes with an anecdotal farmer explaining this slight variant of TANSTAAFL. By the late 1960s, the phrase had also been given the name "Crane's law", for example in an article by Henry D. Harral in the Pennsylvanian (1969).

=== Popularization ===
In 1966, author Robert A. Heinlein published his novel The Moon Is a Harsh Mistress, in which TANSTAAFL was a central, libertarian theme, mentioned by name and explained. This increased its use in the mainstream. Edwin G. Dolan used the phrase as the title of his 1971 book TANSTAAFL (There Ain't No Such Thing As A Free Lunch) – A Libertarian Perspective on Environmental Policy.

== Usage ==
=== Science ===
In the sciences, no free lunch means that the universe as a whole is ultimately a closed system. There is no source of matter, energy, or light that draws resources from something else which will not eventually be exhausted. Therefore, the no free lunch argument may also be applied to natural physical processes in a closed system:either the universe as a whole, or any system that does not receive energy or matter from outside (First law of thermodynamics). The bio-ecologist Barry Commoner used this concept as the last of his famous "Four Laws of Ecology". According to American theoretical physicist and cosmologist Alan Guth "the universe is the ultimate free lunch", given that in the early stage of its expansion the total amount of energy available to make particles was very large.

=== Economics ===
In economics, no free lunch demonstrates opportunity cost. Greg Mankiw described the concept as follows: "To get one thing that we like, we usually have to give up another thing that we like. Making decisions requires trading off one goal against another." The idea that there is no free lunch at the societal level applies only when all resources are being used completely and appropriately – i.e., when economic efficiency prevails. If not, a 'free lunch' can be had through a more efficient utilization of resources. Or, as Fred Brooks put it, "You can only get something for nothing if you have previously gotten nothing for something." If one individual or group gets something at no cost, somebody else ends up paying for it. If there appears to be no direct cost to any single individual, there is a social cost. Similarly, someone can benefit for "free" from an externality or from a public good, but someone has to pay the cost of producing these benefits (free rider problem and tragedy of the commons).

=== Finance ===
In mathematical finance, the term is also used as an informal synonym for the principle of no-arbitrage. This principle states that a combination of securities that has the same cash-flows as another security must have the same net price in equilibrium. See Derivative (finance) § Determining the arbitrage-free price.

=== Statistics ===
In statistics, the term has been used to describe the tradeoffs of statistical learners (e.g., in machine learning) which are unavoidable according to the "No free lunch" theorem. That is, any model that claims to offer superior flexibility in analyzing data patterns usually does so at the cost of introducing extra assumptions, or by sacrificing generalizability in important situations.

=== Sports ===
Baseball Prospectus coined the abbreviation "TINSTAAPP", for "There Is No Such Thing As A Pitching Prospect", as many young pitchers hurt their arms before they can be effective at a major league level.

=== Politics ===
In 2007, Hungarian prime minister Ferenc Gyurcsány used this adage in his criticism of the politics of Hungary since the end of Communism, arguing that all Hungarian political parties had run their campaigns on promises of universally increasing welfare without any underlying structural change, which Gyurcsány viewed as economically unsound populism reminiscent of the rule of the former Hungarian Socialist Workers' Party general secretary János Kádár.

=== Exceptions ===
Some exceptions from the "no free lunch" tenet have been put forward, such as the Sun and carbon dioxide. It was argued in particular that metabolism evolved to take advantage of the free lunch provided by the Sun, which also triggers production of vital oxygen in plants.

== See also ==
- Demonstrated preference
- Have one's cake and eat it too
- He who does not work, neither shall he eat
- List of proverbial phrases
- Milton Friedman
- No free lunch in search and optimization
- No Free Lunch (organization)
- No free lunch with vanishing risk
- No-arbitrage bounds
- Parable of the broken window
- Revealed preferences
- Scarcity
- Tax choice
- Trade-off
- Zero-sum game
