= Fellows of the Network Science Society =

Each year since 2018, the Network Science Society (NetSci Society) selects up to seven members of the network science community to be Fellows based on their enduring contributions to network science research and to the community of network scientists. Fellows are chosen from nominations received by the Network Science Society Fellowship Committee and are announced at the NetSci Conference hosted every year.

== Fellows ==
=== 2025 ===
- Francesco Bullo
- Guanrong Chen
- Hawoong Jeong
- János Kertész
- Renaud Lambiotte
- Philippa E. Pattison
- Mason A. Porter
- Eckehard Schöll
- Sara A. Solla

=== 2024 ===
- Katy Börner
- Albert Díaz-Guilera
- Sergey Dorogovtsev
- Shlomo Havlin
- Petter Holme
- Cristopher Moore
- M. Ángeles Serrano

=== 2023 ===
- Nicholas Christakis
- Aaron Clauset
- Tina Eliassi-Rad
- Ernesto Estrada
- Marta González
- Stanley Wasserman

=== 2022 ===
- Fan Chung
- Vittoria Colizza
- Noshir Contractor
- Santo Fortunato
- Byungnam Kahng
- Yamir Moreno
- Olaf Sporns

=== 2021 ===
- Lada Adamic
- Albert-László Barabási
- Peter Sheridan Dodds
- Jürgen Kurths
- Vito Latora
- Marta Sales-Pardo

=== 2020 ===
- Alex Arenas
- Alain Barrat
- Ginestra Bianconi
- Jennifer A. Dunne
- Michelle Girvan
- Adilson E. Motter
- Brian Uzzi

=== 2019 ===
Fellows appointed at the 2019 NetSci Conference in Vermont, USA.

- Guido Caldarelli
- Raissa M. D'Souza
- Stuart A. Kauffman
- Jon M. Kleinberg
- José Fernando F. Mendes
- Anna Nagurney
- Luís A. Nunes Amaral

=== 2018 ===
Fellows appointed at the 2018 NetSci Conference in Paris, France.

- Réka Albert
- Mark Granovetter
- Yoshiki Kuramoto
- Mark E. J. Newman
- Steven H. Strogatz
- Alessandro Vespignani
- Duncan J. Watts
