= International School and Conference on Network Science =

Annual academic conference on network science

- Abbreviation: NetSci
- Discipline: Network science

Publication details
- History: 2006–present
- Frequency: Annual
- Website: netscisociety.net

'

The International School and Conference on Network Science, commonly known as NetSci, is an annual academic conference devoted to network science, the interdisciplinary study of the structure, dynamics and function of complex networked systems. First held at Indiana University Bloomington in 2006, it is organised under the auspices of the Network Science Society, which describes it as the society's "flagship conference". Editions typically combine a school for students and non-specialists and a programme of satellite symposia with a multi-day scientific conference. Since 2015 the society has also held a shorter winter meeting, NetSci-X, as an additional forum for the field.

The conference aims to foster interdisciplinary communication and collaboration across physics, mathematics, computer and information science, statistics, the life sciences, neuroscience, the social sciences, finance and business, and the arts and design. One of the co-chairs of the 2017 edition remarked that, in the decade since the first conference, network science had grown "from a niche research area to a major interdisciplinary field"; that edition recorded 680 registrations from 29 countries, and the twentieth-anniversary edition in Boston in 2026 drew around 800 participants. The society's principal research prizes, the Erdős–Rényi Prize and the Euler Award, are conferred at the conference, where each recipient delivers a lecture.

== Background ==
NetSci was established while network science was still consolidating as a recognised field of study. In 2005 a committee of the National Research Council, acting at the request of the United States Army, examined whether a distinct field of network science should be recognised; its report described network science as "an emerging field of investigation" and defined it as the study of network representations of physical, biological and social phenomena leading to predictive models of those phenomena. A second report, published in 2007, proposed a strategy for an Army centre devoted to network science, technology and experimentation. When the journal Network Science was launched in 2013, its founding editors characterised the field as one that was "exploding" and still in formation, with its scope, contents and foundations under intense discussion.

== History ==
=== Establishment and early editions ===
The inaugural NetSci conference was held at Indiana University Bloomington in 2006. In the following years the meeting rotated between North America and Europe, convening in New York (2007), Norwich (2008), Venice (2009), Boston (2010), Budapest (2011), Evanston (2012), Copenhagen (2013) and Berkeley (2014). The edition held in Zaragoza in 2015 took place at the city's World Trade Center from 1 to 5 June, and the conference first met in Asia in 2016, in Seoul.

The conferences are organised under the auspices of the Network Science Society. Albert-László Barabási served as its founding president, and the society has credited him and Guido Caldarelli with leading roles in establishing both the network science community and the society itself. Subsequent presidents have been Raissa D'Souza (2015–2018), Yamir Moreno (2018–2022) and Adilson Motter (2022–2025); Michelle Girvan is the current president.

=== Growth, 2017–2019 ===
NetSci 2017 was hosted by the Indiana University Network Science Institute at the JW Marriott in Indianapolis from 19 to 23 June, with Olaf Sporns and Filippo Menczer as co-chairs. With 680 registrations from 29 countries, it was then the largest edition of the series; the programme comprised three keynote and ten plenary lectures, 22 pre-conference satellite workshops and 23 technical sessions containing about 130 oral presentations and 218 posters, and about a third of attendees and speakers came from outside the United States. The 2018 edition in Paris followed the established structure of a two-day school and satellite programme (11–12 June) and a three-day conference (13–15 June), and saw the launch of the society's Young Initiatives, among them an award for the best talk pitch. NetSci 2019 was held in Burlington, Vermont.

=== Pandemic period ===
Three consecutive editions were held online during the COVID-19 pandemic. NetSci 2020, organised by researchers in Rome including Guido Caldarelli and Giulio Cimini, was held online from 17 to 25 September 2020. In 2021 the society and the International Network for Social Network Analysis (INSNA) held their first joint annual meeting, Networks 2021, combining NetSci with INSNA's Sunbelt conference. Originally planned for Washington, DC, it was hosted by the Indiana University Network Science Institute as an all-virtual event, with satellites and workshops from 21 June to 2 July and the main conference from 5 to 10 July 2021. NetSci 2022, nominally hosted in Shanghai, was likewise held online, with its school and satellites from 11 to 24 July and the main conference from 25 to 29 July.

=== Return to in-person meetings ===
NetSci 2023, organised by the Complexity Science Hub and Central European University with Stefan Thurner and János Kertész as scientific chairs, met in Vienna from 10 to 14 July; the organisers expected almost 850 researchers from 50 countries. NetSci 2024 in Québec City (16–21 June) was attended by 484 participants from 35 countries, and NetSci 2025 took place in Maastricht from 2 to 6 June.

The 2026 conference, held from 1 to 5 June and hosted by Northeastern University's Network Science Institute, marked the twentieth anniversary of the series. It drew around 800 participants and featured a joint keynote by Barabási and Réka Albert entitled "Before It Had a Name: From Random Graphs to Real Networks". NetSci 2027 is scheduled to be hosted by the Center Synergy of Systems (SynoSys) at TU Dresden from 17 to 21 May 2027.

== Format ==
A NetSci meeting opens with an international school for students and non-specialists, held alongside satellite symposia on specialised themes. The main conference that follows has lasted three or more days and includes keynote and invited lectures, contributed oral presentations, poster sessions and lightning talks. At NetSci 2027, for example, the satellites and school are scheduled for 17–18 May and the main conference for 18–21 May.

The satellite programme has also served initiatives that extend beyond research. The NetSciEd symposium series on network science and education has been held at NetSci conferences every year since 2012, and a one-day pre-conference event before NetSci 2014 in Berkeley began the collaborative drafting of the Network Literacy: Essential Concepts and Core Ideas booklet.

== NetSci-X ==
NetSci-X (also styled NetSciX) is the society's winter conference. It was introduced in 2015 to provide an additional forum for the growing community of researchers and practitioners working on networks, and has usually been held in January or February. Several editions have brought the series to countries that had not previously hosted a NetSci meeting, among them Tokyo in 2020 and Porto in 2022, the first NetSci meetings in Japan and Portugal respectively. NetSci-X 2020 (Tokyo, 20–23 January) accepted full papers, which were published by Springer as the proceedings of the "Sixth International Winter School and Conference on Network Science". NetSciX 2027 is to be held in Hong Kong from 24 to 27 January 2027 with the special theme "Network Science meets AI".

== List of conferences ==
=== NetSci ===
NetSci conferences
| Year | Location | Notes |
|---|---|---|
| 2006 | Bloomington, United States | Inaugural edition, hosted by Indiana University |
| 2007 | New York, United States | |
| 2008 | Norwich, United Kingdom | |
| 2009 | Venice, Italy | |
| 2010 | Boston, United States | |
| 2011 | Budapest, Hungary | |
| 2012 | Evanston, United States | |
| 2013 | Copenhagen, Denmark | |
| 2014 | Berkeley, United States | |
| 2015 | Zaragoza, Spain | 1–5 June |
| 2016 | Seoul, South Korea | First edition in Asia |
| 2017 | Indianapolis, United States | 19–23 June; 680 registrations from 29 countries |
| 2018 | Paris, France | 11–15 June |
| 2019 | Burlington, United States | |
| 2020 | Online | 17–25 September; organised from Rome |
| 2021 | Online | Networks 2021, joint with INSNA's Sunbelt conference; 5–10 July |
| 2022 | Online | Hosted from Shanghai; 25–29 July |
| 2023 | Vienna, Austria | 10–14 July |
| 2024 | Québec City, Canada | 16–21 June; 484 participants from 35 countries |
| 2025 | Maastricht, Netherlands | 2–6 June |
| 2026 | Boston, United States | 1–5 June; twentieth anniversary |
| 2027 | Dresden, Germany | 17–21 May (scheduled) |

=== NetSci-X ===
NetSci-X conferences
| Year | Location | Notes |
|---|---|---|
| 2015 | Rio de Janeiro, Brazil | First edition |
| 2016 | Wrocław, Poland | |
| 2017 | Tel Aviv, Israel | |
| 2018 | Hangzhou, China | |
| 2019 | Santiago, Chile | |
| 2020 | Tokyo, Japan | 20–23 January; proceedings published by Springer |
| 2022 | Porto, Portugal | 8–11 February |
| 2023 | Buenos Aires, Argentina | 7–10 February |
| 2024 | Venice, Italy | |
| 2025 | Indore, India | |
| 2026 | Auckland, New Zealand | 17–20 February |
| 2027 | Hong Kong | 24–27 January (scheduled) |

== Awards ==
Three of the Network Science Society's annual honours are presented at the conference.

- The Erdős–Rényi Prize, awarded since 2012, recognises a scientist under the age of 40 for research achievements in network science. It carries a cash award of US$3,000, and the recipient lectures in a special session of the conference.
- The Euler Award, awarded since 2019, recognises an outstanding research discovery, particularly one that changed paradigms or assumptions in the field, rather than a body of lifetime work. The recipient likewise delivers a lecture at the conference.
- The NetSci Outstanding Service Award, also awarded since 2019, honours exceptional service to the society and is presented at the conference banquet.

The society additionally elects up to seven Fellows each year, who are honoured at the conference banquet.

Recipients of the society's prizes presented at NetSci
| Year | Erdős–Rényi Prize | Euler Award | Outstanding Service Award |
|---|---|---|---|
| 2012 | Roger Guimerà | — | — |
| 2013 | Adilson E. Motter | — | — |
| 2014 | Mason A. Porter | — | — |
| 2015 | Chaoming Song | — | — |
| 2016 | Aaron Clauset | — | — |
| 2017 | Vittoria Colizza | — | — |
| 2018 | Dani S. Bassett | — | — |
| 2019 | Tiago P. Peixoto | Raissa M. D'Souza | Albert-László Barabási |
| 2020 | Sonia Kéfi | Alessandro Vespignani | Guido Caldarelli |
| 2021 | Dashun Wang | Mark Newman | Bolesław K. Szymański |
| 2022 | Linyuan Lü | Brian Uzzi | Raissa D'Souza |
| 2023 | Daniel B. Larremore | Donald F. Towsley | Ann McCranie |
| 2024 | Antoine Allard | Olaf Sporns | Brooke Foucault Welles |
| 2025 | Federico Battiston | Ginestra Bianconi | Sarika Jalan |
| 2026 | Laurent Hébert-Dufresne | Albert-László Barabási | Yamir Moreno |

== See also ==
- Network science
- Erdős–Rényi Prize
- Fellows of the Network Science Society
- International Network for Social Network Analysis
