= List of network scientists =

This is a list of notable individuals who research complex networks, including social networks, biological networks, and semantic networks, among others. Individuals are categorized based on their background and training, or their area of focus.

== Social and behavioral sciences ==
- Peter Bearman
- Ulrik Brandes
- Ronald S. Burt
- Noshir Contractor
- James Fowler
- Mark Granovetter
- Dirk Helbing
- Matthew O. Jackson
- Helen Hall Jennings
- Frigyes Karinthy
- David Lazer
- Zeev Maoz
- John Levi Martin
- James D. Montgomery
- Anna Nagurney
- Kim Rossmo
- Tom Snijders
- Duncan Watts
- Barry Wellman
- Douglas R. White
- Harrison White

== Computer and information sciences ==
- Lada Adamic
- Vladimir Batagelj
- Randy Bush
- Aaron Clauset
- Anuška Ferligoj
- Jon Kleinberg
- Jure Leskovec
- Filippo Menczer
- Cristopher Moore
- Aleš Žiberna

== Physics ==
- Réka Albert
- Luís A. N. Amaral
- Albert-László Barabási
- Marc Barthelemy
- Kevin E. Bassler
- Dirk Brockmann
- Kim Christensen
- Raissa D'Souza
- Ernesto Estrada
- Michelle Girvan
- Shlomo Havlin
- César Hidalgo
- Vito Latora
- José Fernando Ferreira Mendes
- Yamir Moreno
- Adilson E. Motter
- Mark Newman
- H. Eugene Stanley
- Alessandro Vespignani
- Lenka Zdeborová

== Biology ==
- Uri Alon
- Danielle Bassett
- Caroline Buckee
- Paulien Hogeweg
- Trey Ideker
- Jukka-Pekka Onnela
- Bernhard Palsson
- John Quackenbush
- Olaf Sporns

== Mathematics ==
- Vincent Blondel
- Béla Bollobás
- Chris Danforth
- Peter Sheridan Dodds
- Pául Erdős
- Frank Harary
- László Lovász
- Alfréd Rényi
- Steven Strogatz
- Mason Porter
