= Luciano Pietronero =

Italian physicist

- Born: 15 December 1949 (age 76); Italy
- Known for: Superconductivity, fractals, quantitative finance, cosmology
- Awards: Fermi Prize
- Scientific career
- Fields: Physics
- Institutions: Xerox; Brown Boveri; Groningen; Sapienza (CNR)
- Notable students: Alessandro Vespignani; Guido Caldarelli

Luciano Pietronero (born 15 December 1949) is an Italian physicist (statistical physics) and full professor at the department of Physics at the Sapienza University of Rome. He is also Director of the Institute of Complex Systems of the National Research Council (Consiglio Nazionale delle Ricerche).

== Biography ==
Pietronero was born in Rome and obtained a degree in Physics there in 1971. He is married, has two children and lives in Rome.

== Career ==
He worked first at the Xerox Webster research Center and then the Brown Boveri Research Center where he stayed until 1983. After that he moved to Groningen in the Department of Physics as Professor of Condensed Matter Theory. He is now a full professor of Condensed Matter Physics, University of Roma "La Sapienza".

In 2004 Pietronero founded the CNR Institute of Complex Systems (ISC). The Institute includes more than 200 scientists (in various locations in Rome and Florence) from different groups of CNR, INFM, INOA and Universities.

He was elected a Fellow of the American Physical Society in 1990 "for contributions to the theory of fractals, including the dielectric-breakdown model and his extensions of the theory of diffusion-limited aggregation and applications of fractal methods to astronomy" In 2007 he was the chairman of the 23rd edition of the STATPHYS conference held in Genova. In 2008 he was awarded the Enrico Fermi Prize, the top prize of the Italian Physical Society.

He has contributed to the study of fitness economics, an aspect of complexity economics.

Pietronero is author of about 350 scientific papers, mostly in leading international scientific journals like Nature; Physical Review Letters; Rev. Mod. Phys.; Physics Reports; Phys. Rev. B ed E; Europhys. Lett.; Physica A; Journal of Physics etc. (Above 5000 ISI citations). He is also the author of a monographic volume and the editor of several volumes of proceedings.

== Books ==
- Statistical Physics for Cosmic Structures, by A. Gabrielli, F. S. Labini, M. Joyce and L. Pietronero, was published by Springer in 2004.
