= Marion Asche =

German physicist and professor

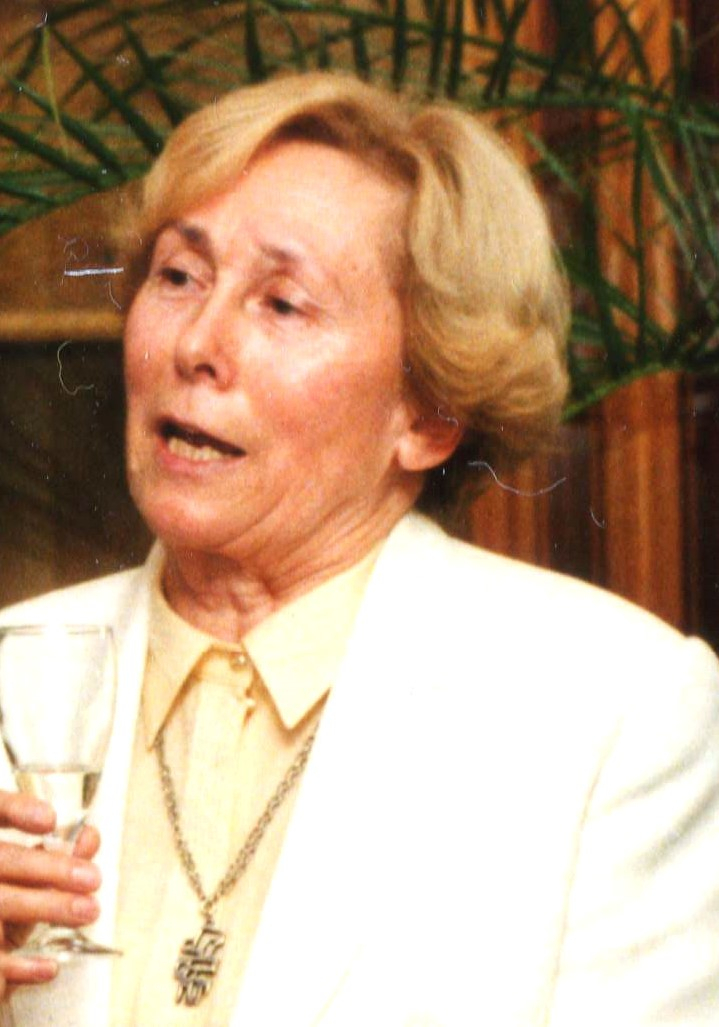
- Born: Marion Asche; 7 January 1935; Berlin, Germany
- Died: 11 December 2013 (aged 78); Berlin, Germany
- Occupation: Physicist

Marion Asche (7 January 1935 – 11 December 2013) was a German physicist and professor of solid state physics. She is known for her pioneering work in semiconductor physics.

== Life ==
Marion Asche was born in Berlin to Lisa Asche and Werner Asche. In 1941 she started school in Berlin-Prenzlauer Berg, but a year later, because of the bombing raids on Berlin, her mother took her daughter and son to Lauterbach near Putbus on the island of Rügen, where Asche went to school. In 1945, the family returned to their apartment in East Berlin.

Asche graduated from high school in Berlin in 1953 and then she studied physics at the Humboldt University of Berlin (HUB). From 1957 to 1959, Marion Asche carried out investigations on cadmium sulfide (CdS) crystals at the Institute for Solid State Research of the German Academy of Sciences (DAW) and received a physicist diploma from Humboldt.

=== Semiconductor research ===
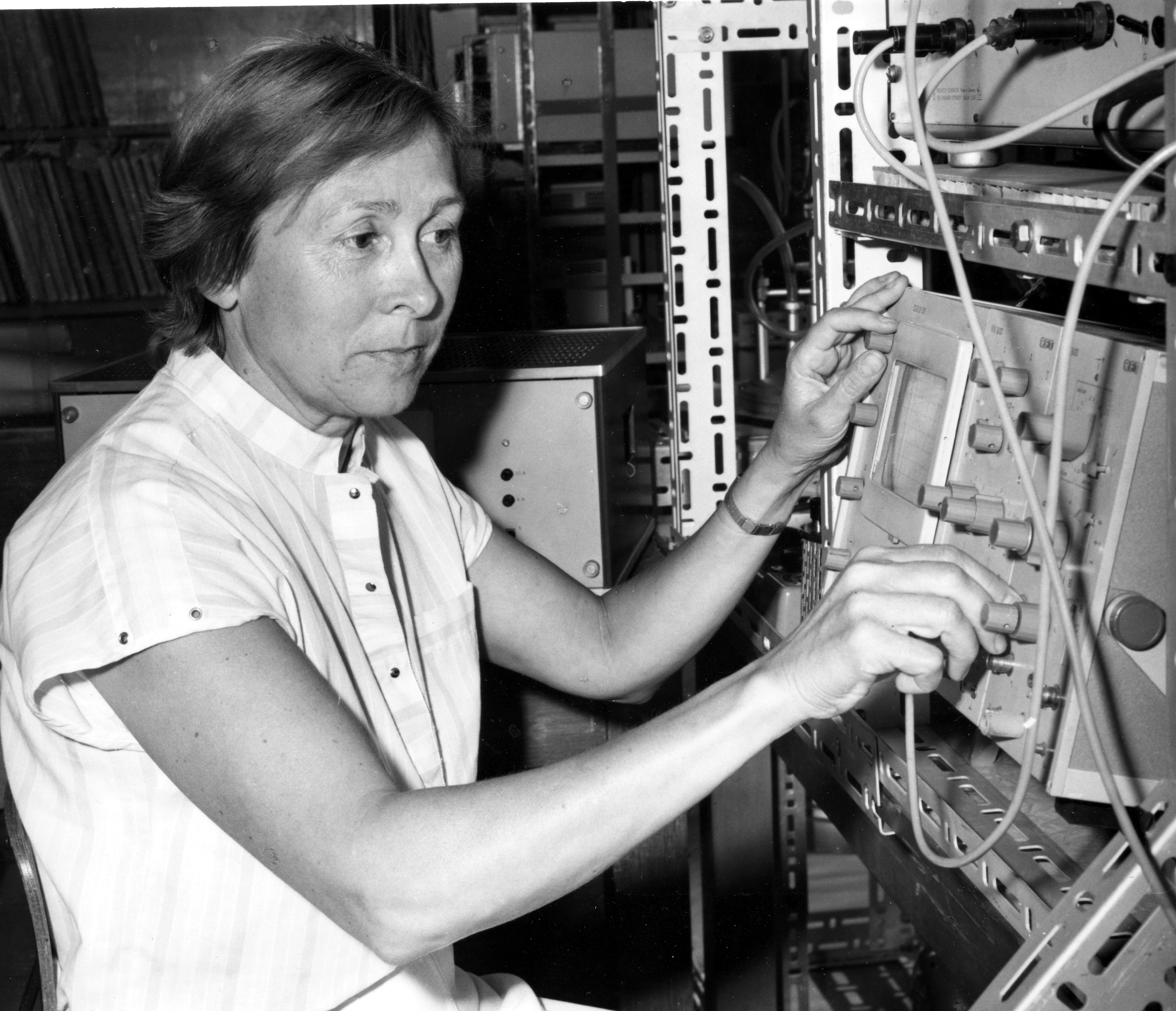
Asche in the laboratory, 1963

Asche began working at the DAW in late 1959 as a scientific assistant in the Physikalisch-Technische Institut, which later became the Central Institute for Electron Physics of the Academy of Sciences of the German Democratic Republic. There she initially took on the task of preparing the piezoresistance of various semiconductor materials, how to research p-germanium among others. For this purpose, she designed a special facility for carrying out her experiments and, after its completion, carried out the long-term measurements and published the first scientific results in 1963.

Toward the end of 1963, Oleg Sarbey, who had a doctorate from Kiev, came to the Institute of Physics and Technology as a visiting scientist. (She would marry Sarby in 2005). From that time until the end of her academic career, Asche worked very closely with Sarbey and the staff of the Ukrainian Academy of Sciences. In 1964, Asche spent six months in Kiev. Her collaboration there proved to be very successful and at the end of 1965 she received her doctorate with distinction at HUB with a dissertation on Hot Electrons in Silicon.

In the following period, her experimental and theoretical investigations of semiconductors in strong electric fields were expanded. Her published results found international recognition and formed the basis for her habilitation thesis. In 1970, Asche received the academic degree Doctor sc. Nat. at the HUB.

=== Research ===
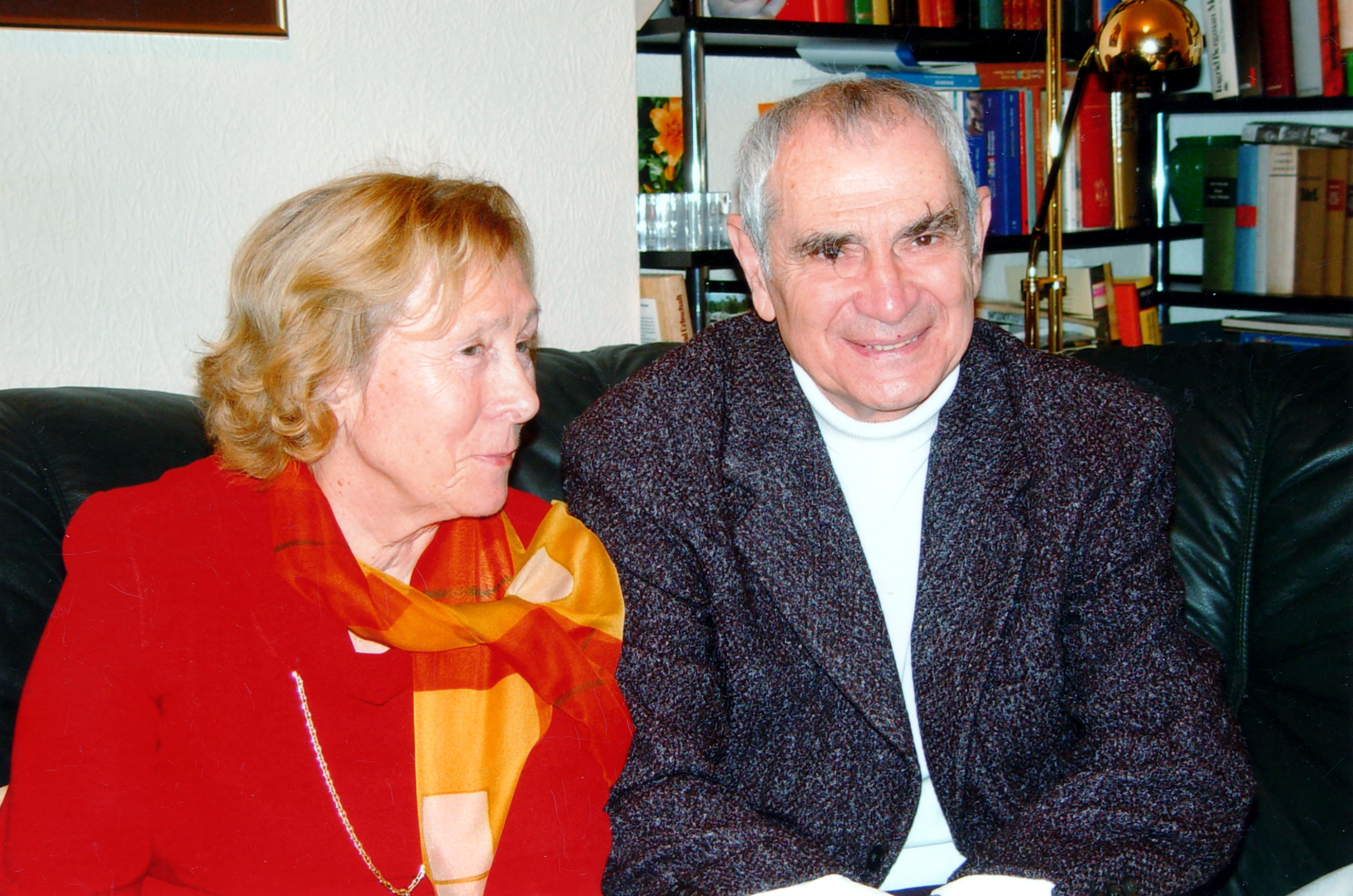
Asche and Oleg Sarbey

Over the next ten years, Asche, in cooperation with her Ukrainian colleagues, examined the phenomena of transport in strong electric and magnetic fields, leading to a number of previously unobserved phenomena.

The inclusion of low temperatures in the measurements led Asche in 1984 to the observation of a spontaneous symmetry breaking in the distribution of electrons in multi-valley semiconductors, which was previously predicted by the Kiev theorists and which is now known as discovery number 294 by the State Committee for Invention and Discovery of the Soviet Union was recognized and registered in 1986 (with the priority of 1984). This was the first case of a physical discovery with the participation of German scientists at that time.^{[1]}

She was named a professor of Humboldt University in 1987.

Characteristic for Asche as a scientist was the all-round participation in the investigations she carried out, from grinding the samples, which she often did herself, to working theoretically on the results and writing down the research results and specialist articles. In 1987, Ashe was awarded for "outstanding scientific achievements in the field of semiconductor physics" by the president of the Academy of Sciences of the GDR (AdW) Werner Scheler.

She expanded her interests in solid-state physics and, in cooperation with her Kiev colleagues, took part in studies of ballistic phonons, non-linear optical processes, cooling of electron-hole plasma in semiconductors, and other contemporary topics in solid-state physics in the 1980s and 1990s. In the later years of her scientific research, her interest was devoted to the investigation of two-dimensional systems.

=== International cooperation ===
She received many invitations to give lectures at international conferences including in renowned institutions in the Federal Republic of Germany and abroad. She was invited to give lectures in France, Italy, Austria, Denmark, the Soviet Union and the Federal Republic of Germany even before German reunification in 1989.

Asche worked closely with Ukrainian physicists but was only able to hold sporadic discussions with physicists from the western world before 1989. After the opening of the border she worked intensively with English and West German scientists, and this also resulted in a number of joint scientific publications. These emerged in particular from the long-term cooperation with Frederick Koch who was chair at the Technical University of Munich and of Eckehard Schöll, chair at Technische Universität Berlin.

From 1971 to 1979, she headed a working group investigating hot electrons at the AdW, and from December 1990 to 1992 she was head of the department for semiconductor transport at the Central Institute for Electron Physics at the AdW. She was also very active in founding the Paul Drude Institute for Solid State Electronics of the Leibniz Association, where she worked until she retired in 2000.

As the then chairman of the Physikalische Society of Berlin, Wolfgang Richter, wrote about her in 1999:

I would like to emphasize here another field in which you have rendered outstanding services. You have rendered outstanding services. I mean the unification of the Berlin physicists after the fall of the Berlin Wall. Already soon after the first contacts of the then East Berlin physicists with the Physikalische Society of Berlin, you acted as a permanent representative on the board of our society. You took over the chairmanship of the board - as the first and so far only woman! - in the years 1994 to 1996.

=== Published work ===
Asche published more than 70 publications in international journals, two of which are review articles that have been cited by many specialists. She worked on three monographs that were published by the Naukowa Dumka publishing house in Kiev and the Springer publishing house in Heidelberg. She also wrote specialist articles for the ABC of Physics published by Brockhaus Verlag and for the Ukrainian encyclopedic dictionary.

She was also the co-author of three patents and supervised numerous diploma and doctoral theses.

== Selected publications ==
- Asche, M., & Sarbei, O. G. (1984). The Role of Electron‐Hole Interaction in the Cooling Process of Highly Excited Carriers. Physica Status Solidi B, 126(2), 607-616.
- Asche, M. (1985). Multivalued distributions of hot electrons between equivalent valleys. Hot-Electron Transport in Semiconductors, 149-176.
- Asche, M., & Sarbei, O. G. (1987). Nonequilibrium dynamics of carriers and phonons in GaAs after high excitation by short time laser pulses. Physica Status Solidi B, 141(2), 487-491.
- Asche, M. (1991). Hot electrons—Electron-phonon interaction. In Festkörperprobleme 31 (pp. 279–295). Springer, Berlin, Heidelberg.
- Asche, M. (1993). Hot Electrons in -Doped GaAs. NATO ASI SERIES B PHYSICS, 307, 317-317.
- Asche, M., Canali, C., Constant, E., Hess, K., Iafrate, G. J., Komijama, S., ... & Pozhela, Y. K. (2006). Hot-electron transport in semiconductors (Vol. 58). Springer Science & Business Media.
