= CEU Center for Network Science =

Research centre at Central European University

The Center for Network Science (CNS) had been a research centre founded in 2009 by Balazs Vedres at Central European University (CEU) in Budapest, Hungary. It has transformed into the Department of Network and Data Science at CEU in 2018. It is intended to provide an organizational platform for network science research, and a hub for European network study. The research focus of CNS is practical social problems. The Center also offers a non-degree certificate for PhD students in economics and political science at CEU.

Notable faculty and staff include:

- Balázs Vedres – Director of CNS, Associate Professor at the Department of Sociology and Social Anthropology, Central European University. Main interests: economic sociology, social networks, historical sociology, postsocialism, and methods.
- Albert-László Barabási – Part-time faculty member, recurrent visitor.
- Jean-Louis Fabiani - Professor at the Department of Sociology and Social Anthropology, Central European University. Main interests: sociology of culture, academic production, the sociology of science, and discourse processes.

== Events ==
June 6–10, 2011. NetSci 2011: The International School and Conference on Network Science

January 28, 2010. Circuits of Profit: Business Network Research Conference This one-day conference brought together academics and practitioners from to discuss issues including organizational restructuring and political lobbying and corruption, marketing, and finance. The conference was organized together with Maven7 and the Hungarian Sociological Association.

June 17–18, 2009. Conference. The Unexpected Link: Using Network Science to Tackle Social Problems Featured topics of the conference were networks linking nature and society; global networks of risk; teams of collaboration - creativity and collusion; the emergence of social order; organizations, markets, and governance; biological webs and human impacts on the environment; bridging the gap between social and biological networks, as well as future directions in network science and transnational - interdisciplinary collaborations: what should a center for network science aim at?

== PhD program ==
The Central European University offers Phd programs in Economics and in Political Science with a certificate in Network Science. The Center for Network Science provides an organizational platform for research using network science tools. The students have to take some mandatory and elective courses of the Center of Network Science to participate.

== Research projects ==
Ceunet CNS’s own software for analysis and handling of network data. The software is still under development focusing on the following functions: conversion and handling, role analysis/blockmodeling, second-order ties, and simultaneous handling of attributional and relational data. This is a freeware software.

Mapping European Network Science (2010) In this project the co-authorship network of European scholars, who presented any paper at INSNA Sunbelt conferences or the NetSci annual conferences between 2005 and 2008 is mapped. The conclusion is basically that the European network science is very fragmented. Growing more cohesive would mean a higher scientific impact as component size and citation count have a positive correlation.

== Honors ==
The article of Balázs Vedres, director of Center for Network Science, won two prizes in 2011. The title of the paper is “Structural Folds: Generative Disruption in Overlapping Groups” and is co-authored with David Stark. It aims at analyzing the relationship between structural folds in a business group and the emergence of innovations and new, creative ideas. The awards were the 2011 Viviana Zelizer Award from the American Sociological Association (ASA), which is given every year to the authors of an outstanding article in the field of economic sociology and the 2011 Roger V. Gould Prize from the editorial board of The American Journal of Sociology (AJS).
