= Vittoria Colizza =

Italian scientist

Vittoria Colizza is an Italian scientist, research director at INSERM and a specialist in mathematical modeling of infectious disease and computational epidemiology. In particular, she has carried out research on the modeling of seasonal and pandemic flu, Ebola and the COVID-19 pandemic.

== Career ==
Vittoria Colizza was born in 1978 in Rome, Italy. She earned her undergraduate degree in physics from the University of Rome Sapienza in Italy, in 2001 and her PhD in Statistical and Biological Physics from the International School for Advanced Studies, Italy in 2004. After that, she moved to the United States and conducted postdoctoral research at the University of Indiana in Bloomington from 2004 to 2006 under the direction of Alessandro Vespignani, through a grant from the European Research Council, before becoming a visiting assistant professor at the same institution from 2006 to 2007.

In 2007, Colizza joined the ISI Foundation in Turin, Italy, starting a new lab after receiving the award of a Starting Independent Career Grant in Life Sciences by the European Research Council Ideas Program. Here, she conducted research on the 2009 Influenza A (H1N1) pandemic.

In 2011, Colizza joined the INSERM (French National Institute for Health and Medical Research) in Paris, where she was promoted to Research Director in 2017. She currently leads the EPICx lab at INSERM and works on modeling the spread of emerging infectious diseases using statistical physics, computational sciences and mathematical epidemiology.

Colizza has also been a visiting professor at Tokyo Institute of Technology since 2020.

== Research ==
Collizza is known for her research on infectious disease dynamics and public health, using data-driven mathematical and computational models. Her research focuses on how hosts' behavior such as contact, commuting, air travel, migration, etc) result in the spread of disease. (CITE ORCID) and applications of her work can be seen in epidemics in humans (e.g. 2009 Influenza A (H1N1) pandemic, Ebola virus epidemic, seasonal flu, COVID-19 pandemic) and in animals (bovine brucellosis and tuberculosis), raising awareness of infectious diseases, providing risk assessment analyses to enable preparedness, mitigation and control of such diseases.

Colizza has played a large role in the COVID-19 pandemic research in 2020. Her research includes predicting trends in importations of the pandemic in France and in Europe and also quantifying undetected imported cases, and evaluating the impact of lockdown measures in France and the proposal of exit strategies. Colizza and her team have been also investigating the effect of school closure and testing in the mitigation of COVID-19.

== Awards and honors ==
- 2021: Prix Irène Joliot Curie – Prix spécial de l'engagement by the French Academy of Sciences
- 2020: Knight of the Order of Merit of the Italian Republic
- 2012: Louis-Daniel Beauperthuy Prize from the Académie des Sciences
- 2013: Young Scientist Prize in Socio-Econophysics 2013, awarded by the German Physics Association.
- 2017: Erdős–Rényi prize for her contributions to fundamental and data-based modeling of network epidemic processes.
- 2017: Telethon-Farmindustria Award for her research predicting the peak of the Influenza A (H1N1) pandemic in 40 countries.

== Publications (selected) ==
Vittoria Colizza has published or co-published more than a hundred scientific articles at the end of 2020, including:

- Marius Gilbert, Vittoria Colizza & all, Preparedness and vulnerability of African countries against imports of COVID-19: a modeling study, The Lancet, Volume 395, Issue 10227, 14–20 March 2020, Pages 871-877
- Di Domenico, L., Pullano, G., Sabbatini, CE, Boëlle, PY, & Colizza, V. (2020). Expected impact of lockdown in Île-de-France and possible exit strategies. medRxiv .
- Colizza, Vittoria, Alain Barrat, Marc Barthélemy, and Alessandro Vespignani. "The role of the airline transportation network in the prediction and predictability of global epidemics." Proceedings of the National Academy of Sciences 103, no. 7 (2006): 2015-2020.
- Colizza, Vittoria, Alain Barrat, Marc Barthelemy, Alain-Jacques Valleron, and Alessandro Vespignani. "Modeling the worldwide spread of pandemic influenza: baseline case and containment interventions." PLoS Med 4, no. 1 (2007): e13.
- Balcan, D., Colizza, V., Gonçalves, B., Hu, H., Ramasco, JJ and Vespignani, A., 2009. Multiscale mobility networks and the spatial spreading of infectious diseases. Proceedings of the National Academy of Sciences, 106 (51), pp. 21484-21489.
