= Lagrange Prize =

Lagrange-CRT Foundation Prize
- Awarded for: Outstanding contributions relevant to the progress of complexity science
- Country: Italy
- Presented by: CRT Foundation and ISI Foundation
- First award: 2008

The Lagrange-CRT Foundation Prize is an annual International award created by the CRT Foundation with the scientific coordination of the ISI Foundation. The prize is awarded for scientific research in the field of complexity sciences, its applications and dissemination. The Lagrange Prize is awarded in Turin, Italy.

== Aim and Criteria ==
The Lagrange-CRT Foundation Prize is awarded to a selected scientist for achievements in research on complex systems, including theoretical and experimental research. In particular, the prize recognizes outstanding contributions relevant to the progress of complexity science.

The Lagrange Prize – CRT Foundation is a prize for the study of complex systems. Established in 2008 as a crucial element of the Lagrange Project, the award activates and gathers various research communities, celebrating major accomplishments in the field. Among the names of the awardees are leading figures in science, including Nobel laureates.

== The Prize ==
The winner of the Lagrange-CRT Foundation Prize is chosen by the Scientific Commission in collaboration with the ISI Foundation. The prize is in the amount of €50,000. The award ceremony takes place in Turin.

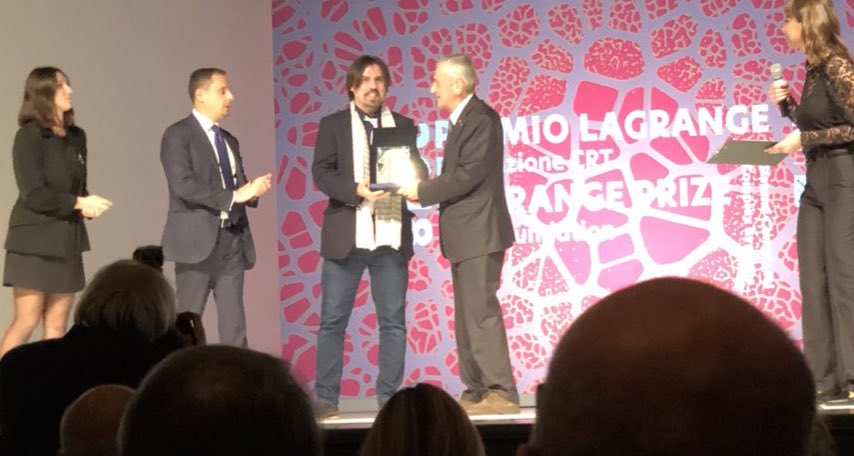
Cesar A. Hidalgo receiving the Lagrange Prize in Turin, Italy, 2018.

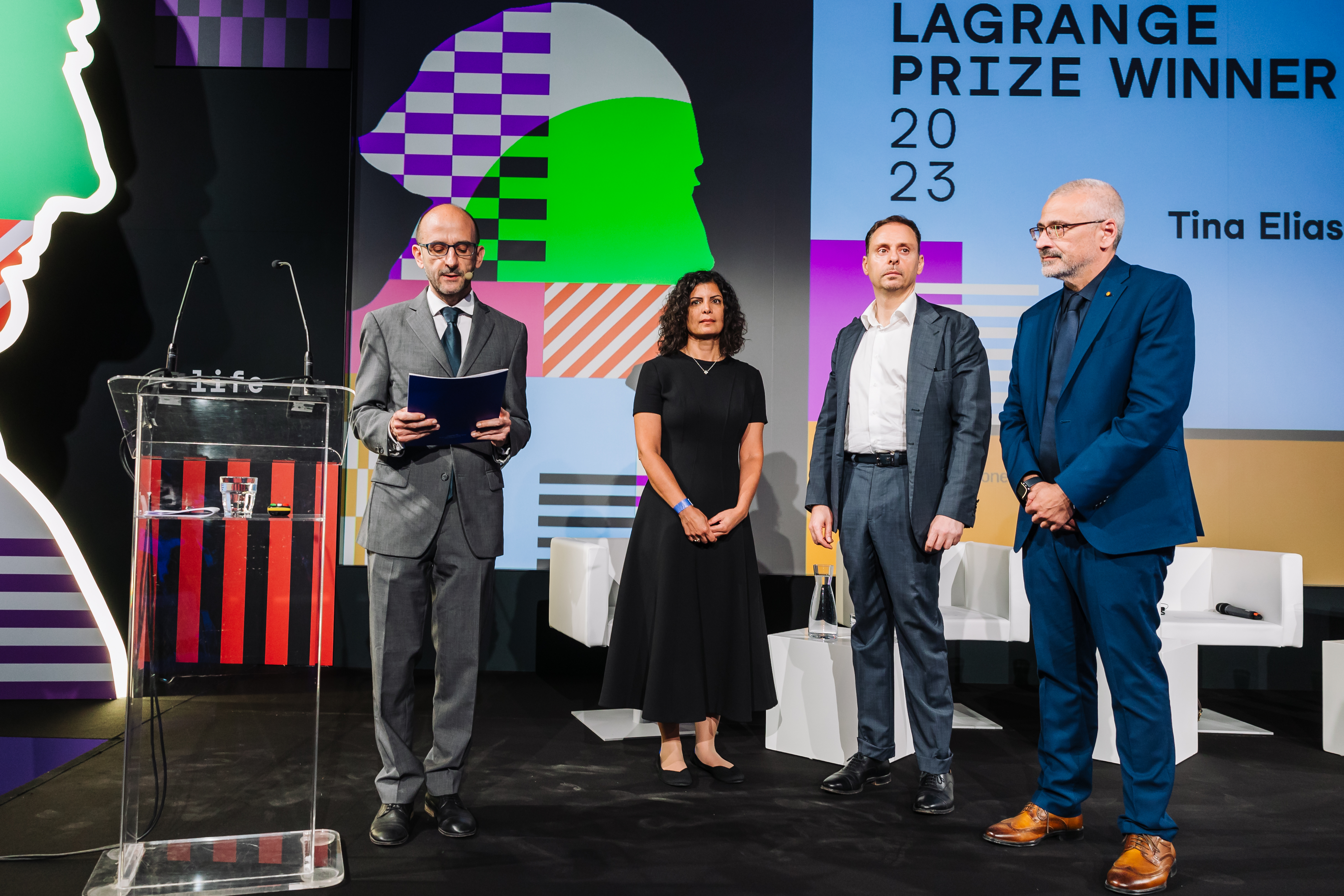

== List of Winners ==
- 2025 Iyad Rahwan (Syria)
- 2024 Marta C. González (Venezuela)
- 2023 Tina Eliassi-Rad (United States)
- 2020 Corona-Researchers at the Institute for Scientific Interchange
- 2019 Iain Couzin (United Kingdom) , David Gruber (United States)
- 2018 Cesar Hidalgo (Chile)
- 2017 Danielle Bassett (United States)
- 2016 John Brownstein (Canada)
- 2015 Panos Ipeirotis (Greece) , Jure Leskovec (Slovenia)
- 2014 Mark Newman (United Kingdom)
- 2013 Duncan J. Watts (Australia)
- 2012 Lada Adamic (United States) , Xavier Gabaix (France)
- 2011 Albert-László Barabási (Hungary)
- 2010 James J. Collins (United States)
- 2009 Giorgio Parisi (Italy)
- 2008 Yakov G. Sinai (Russia) , W. Brian Arthur (United Kingdom)

== Special Prize for Diffusion and Promotion of the Culture of Complexity ==
- 2013 Riccardo Luna
- 2009 Mark Buchanan
- 2008 Philip Ball
