= Lists of network protocols =

This is a list of articles that list different types or classifications of communication protocols used in computer networks.

Lists of protocols
| Topic | List |
|---|---|
| TCP- and UDP-based protocols | List of TCP and UDP port numbers |
| Automation | List of automation protocols |
| Bluetooth | List of Bluetooth protocols |
| File transfer | Comparison of file transfer protocols |
| Instant messaging | Comparison of instant messaging protocols |
| Internet Protocol | List of IP protocol numbers |
| Link aggregation | List of Nortel protocols |
| OSI protocols | List of network protocols (OSI model) |
| Protocol stacks | List of network protocol stacks |
| Routing | List of ad hoc routing protocols |
| Routing | List of routing protocols |
| Web services | List of web service protocols |

== See also ==
- List of network buses
- List of network scientists
- Outline of computing
