= List of network protocol stacks =

This is a list of protocol stack architectures. A protocol stack is a suite of complementary communications protocols in a computer network or a computer bus system.

- ARCNET
- AppleTalk
- ATM
- Bluetooth
- DECnet
- Ethernet
- FDDI
- Frame Relay
- HIPPI
- IEEE 1394 a.k.a. FireWire, iLink
- IEEE 802.11 a.k.a. Wireless LAN (Wi-Fi certification)
- IEEE-488
- Internet protocol suite
- IPX
- Myrinet
- OSI protocol suite
- QsNet
- SPX
- System Network Architecture
- Token Ring
- USB
- X.25 protocol suite

== See also ==
- Lists of network protocols
- IEEE 802
