= Erdős–Rényi Prize =

The Erdős–Rényi Prize of the Network Science Society is named after Paul Erdős and Alfréd Rényi. This international prize is awarded annually in a special ceremony at the International Conference on Network Science to a selected young scientist (under 40 years old on the day of the nomination deadline) for their research achievements in the area of network science, broadly construed. While the achievements can be both theoretical and experimental, the prize is aimed at emphasizing outstanding contributions relevant to the interdisciplinary progress of network science.

Past recipients are:

- 2012: Roger Guimera, Rovira i Virgili University, for outstanding work as a young researcher in Network Science for the technical depth and the interdisciplinary values of his scientific contributions to the analysis of network cartography and community identification.
- 2013: Adilson E. Motter, Northwestern University, for his groundbreaking contributions to the study of synchronization phenomena and the control of cascading failures in complex networks.
- 2014: Mason A. Porter, University of Oxford, for his fundamental research on the mathematics of networks and his outreach efforts to teach network science to students in schools.
- 2015: Chaoming Song, University of Miami, for the breadth and depth of his influential work, ranging from network applications of self-similarity and renormalization group theory to the in-depth analysis of big data on human mobility.
- 2016: Aaron Clauset, University of Colorado Boulder, for his contributions to the study of network structure, including Internet mapping, inference of missing links, and community structure, and for his provocative analyses of human conflicts and social stratification.
- 2017: Vittoria Colizza, Inserm, for contributions to fundamental and data-driven network-based modeling of epidemic processes, including seminal studies on metapopulation systems, the impact of air transportation, and the predictability of epidemic outbreaks.
- 2018: Danielle Bassett, University of Pennsylvania, for fundamental contributions to our understanding of the network architecture of the human brain, its evolution over learning and development, and its alteration in neurological disease.
- 2019: Tiago P. Peixoto, Central European University, for groundbreaking contributions to the statistical analysis and visualization of networks, including efficient and principled inference algorithms based on the stochastic block model, and compression and prediction of richly annotated or hierarchical structures.
- 2020: Sonia Kéfi, CNRS, for foundational and empirically grounded theoretical research that has advanced network science and its applications in ecology, with a focus on multiple types of interactions among species and the implications for global change, opening the path to new ways to study ecosystems.
- 2021: Dashun Wang, Northwestern University, for foundational and empirically grounded theoretical research that has advanced network science and its applications in the field of computational social sciences, with a focus on the science of science and on developing methods related to quantifying and improving human achievement and standards-of-living.
- 2022: Linyuan Lü, University of Electronic Science and Technology of China, for groundbreaking contributions to network information filtering, including seminal works on link prediction and detection of influential nodes in networked structures, and their technological applications.
- 2023: Daniel B. Larremore, University of Colorado Boulder, for socially impactful contributions to network models of human-disease dynamics, with applications to malaria and the COVID-19 pandemic, and for foundational research in the theoretical and practical use of algorithms for community detection.
- 2024: Antoine Allard, Université Laval, for the breadth and depth of his contributions to modeling complex systems as networks, including the geometry of networks and the role of heterogeneity and superspreading in contemporary diseases and complex contagions.
- 2025: Federico Battiston, Central European University, for seminal work on emergent collective behavior in higher-order networks and interdisciplinary applications of network science, in particular, to describe social phenomena.
- 2026: Laurent Hébert-Dufresne, University of Vermont, for foundational contributions to the theory of contagion on complex networks, illuminating how network structure, higher-order interactions, and nonlinear transmission mechanisms shape the spread of diseases, behaviors, and ideas.

== See also ==
- List of computer science awards
