= Tina Eliassi-Rad =

American computer scientist

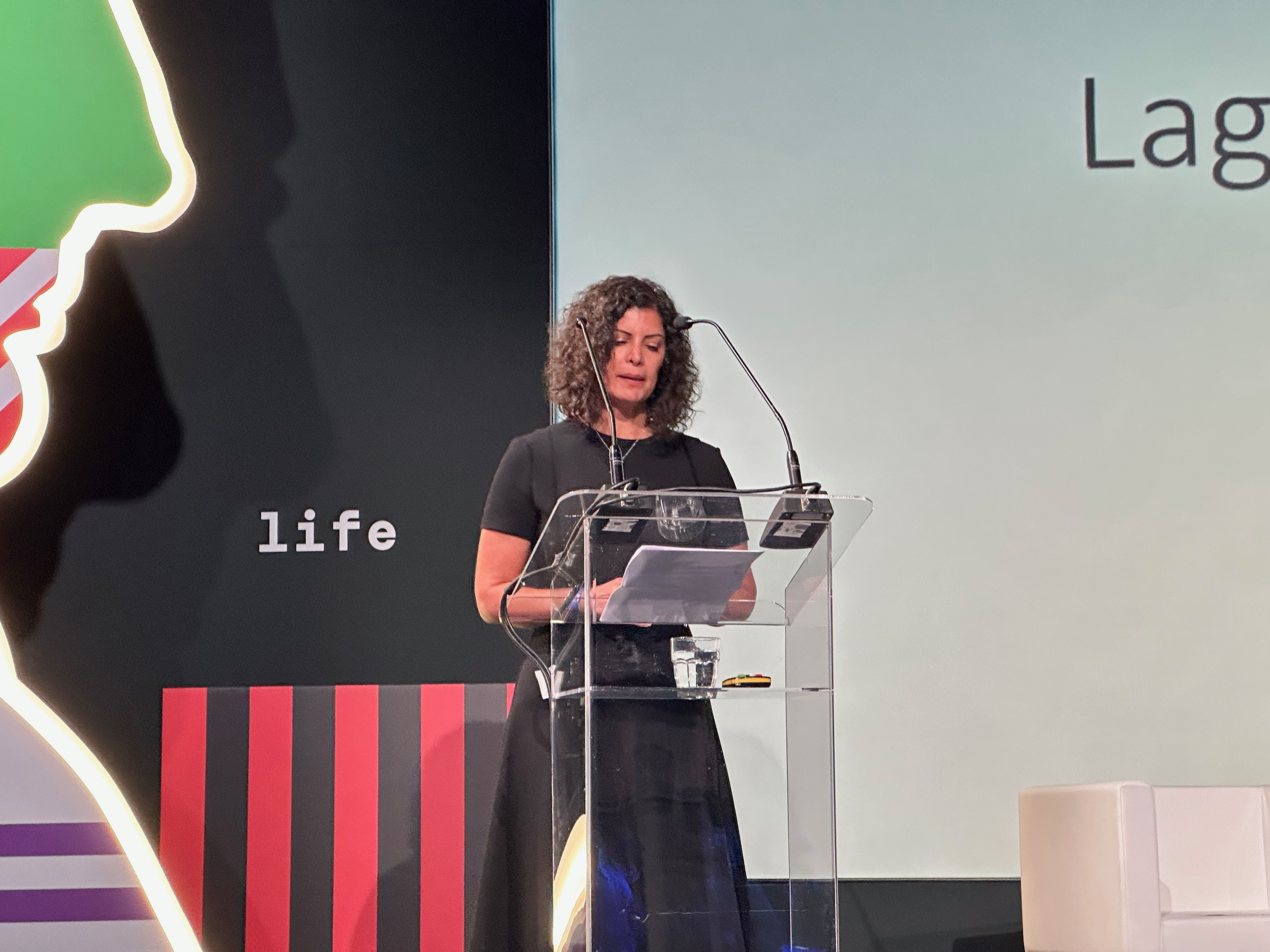
- Eliassi-Rad in 2023
- Education: University of Wisconsin–Madison; University of Illinois at Urbana–Champaign
- Awards: Lagrange Prize (2023), Network Science Society Fellow (2023)
- Scientific career
- Workplaces: Northeastern University; Rutgers University; Lawrence Livermore National Laboratory
- Thesis: Building intelligent agents that learn to retrieve and extract information (2001)
- Website: Eliassi.org

Tina Eliassi-Rad is an American computer scientist and the inaugural President Joseph E. Aoun Professor at Northeastern University. Her research is at the intersection of artificial intelligence (namely, data mining and machine learning), network science, and applied ethics. In 2023, she won the Lagrange Prize for her work on ethical approaches to artificial intelligence.

== Early life and education ==
Eliassi-Rad studied computer sciences at the University of Wisconsin–Madison. She earned a bachelor's degree with distinction in 1993, before moving to Illinois to begin graduate program at the University of Illinois at Urbana–Champaign. She returned to Wisconsin for her doctoral research, where she worked on intelligent agents. After graduating, Eliassi-Rad joined the research team at the Lawrence Livermore National Laboratory.

== Research and career ==
Eliassi-Rad joined Rutgers University as an assistant professor in 2010. She moved to Northeastern University in 2016, where she was made Professor in 2020. She is part of the Northeastern University Network Science Institute. She currently teaches the honors inquiry course "Algorithms That Affect Lives."

== Awards and honors ==
- 2010 United States Department of Energy Office of Science Outstanding Mentor Award
- 2019 Elected Fellow of the Institute for Scientific Interchange
- 2021 One of the 100 Brilliant Women in AI Ethics
- 2022 Northeastern University Excellence in Research and Creative Activity Award
- 2023 Lagrange Prize-CRT Foundation
- 2023 Network Science Society Fellow

== Selected publications ==
- Sen, Prithviraj; Namata, Galileo; Bilgic, Mustafa; Getoor, Lise; Galligher, Brian; Eliassi-Rad, Tina (2008-09-06). "Collective Classification in Network Data". AI Magazine. 29 (3): 93. doi:10.1609/aimag.v29i3.2157. hdl:1903/7546. ISSN 2371-9621.
- Henderson, Keith; Gallagher, Brian; Eliassi-Rad, Tina; Tong, Hanghang; Basu, Sugato; Akoglu, Leman; Koutra, Danai; Faloutsos, Christos; Li, Lei (2012-08-12). "RolX". Proceedings of the 18th ACM SIGKDD international conference on Knowledge discovery and data mining. KDD '12. Beijing, China: Association for Computing Machinery. pp. 1231–1239. doi:10.1145/2339530.2339723. ISBN 978-1-4503-1462-6. S2CID 458476.
- Tong, Hanghang; Faloutsos, Christos; Gallagher, Brian; Eliassi-Rad, Tina (2007-08-12). "Fast best-effort pattern matching in large attributed graphs". Proceedings of the 13th ACM SIGKDD international conference on Knowledge discovery and data mining. KDD '07. San Jose, California, USA: Association for Computing Machinery. pp. 737–746. doi:10.1145/1281192.1281271. ISBN 978-1-59593-609-7. S2CID 6238562.
