= Institute for Scientific Interchange =

Institute for Scientific Interchange Foundation (ISI Foundation)
- Abbreviation: ISI Foundation
- Formation: 1983
- Type: public scientific research institute
- Location: Turin, Italy, EU
- President: Alessandro Vespignani
- Scientific Director: Ciro Cattuto
- Website: http://www.isi.it

The Institute for Scientific Interchange (Italian: Istituto per l'Interscambio Scientifico, ISI Foundation, ISI) is an independent, resident-based research institute located in Turin (Italy, EU).

Its primary objective is scientific research and advanced training in the fields of data science, complex systems, and the applications of data and computational models for social impact and public health.

== History ==
ISI was founded in 1983 by the regional government, the province and city of Turin, and by two banking institutions in Piedmont: CRT Foundation and Compagnia di San Paolo .

Since 1983, the CRT Foundation has been the main supporter of ISI Foundation's activities, which are also funded by research projects from the European Commission and other banking foundations.

ISI Foundation hosts researchers primarily engaged in the study of complex systems.

In the 2011 SIR World Report of Institutional Rankings, ISI ranked 28th in Europe for scientific impact, 87th worldwide and 1/4th of the articles produced at ISI are in the top cited 10%.

The ISI Foundation oversees the scientific coordination of the Lagrange-CRT Foundation Prize an annual International award created by the CRT Foundation

=== Description ===
ISI focuses on: complex networks, complexity science, Data Science for Social Impact and Sustainability, Computational Epidemiology.

=== Training ===
- Joint masters-level program: the Lagrange Scholarships, the Master in Epidemiology
- Doctoral studies: possibility to host PhD students wishing to pursue full-time graduate studies under the supervision of an ISI faculty member. PhD students receive their doctoral degrees from a university partner, which can range in locations.
- Courses: Selection of planned courses each year, including cross-listed programs with universities and mini-courses given by ISI Faculty, associate faculty, and visiting researchers.

== Governance ==
=== Board of trustees ===
- Alessandro Vespignani, President
- Annapaola Venezia, Fondazione Sviluppo e Crescita CRT
- Pierluigi Poggiolini, Politecnico di Torino

=== Scientific Advisory Board ===
- Noshir Contractor, Northwestern University
- Fosca Giannotti, Scuola Normale Superiore, Pisa
- Massimo Lapucci, Digital Ethics Center, Yale University
- Nuria Oliver, ELLIS Alicante Foundation
- Stefaan Gerard Verhulst, The GovLab
- Ingmar Weber, Saarland University
- Alessandro Vespignani, President
