= Iain Couzin =

British scientist

- Education: University of St Andrews; University of Bath
- Scientific career
- Fields: Biology
- Workplaces: University of Leeds; University of Oxford; Princeton University; University of Konstanz

Iain Couzin is a British scientist and currently one of the directors of the Max Planck Institute of Animal Behavior, Department of Collective Behaviour and the chair of Biodiversity and Collective Behaviour at the University of Konstanz (Germany). He is known for his work on collective behaviour in animals that aims to understand the fundamental patterns responsible for evolution of such behaviour in taxa as diverse as insects, fish and primates.

== Education ==
Couzin obtained his B.Sc. in biology from the University of St Andrews, followed by a Ph.D. in Biological sciences, from the University of Bath in 1999 under the supervision of Professor Nigel R. Franks. He was then a postdoctoral researcher at the University of Leeds from 2000 to 2002 and a Royal Society Research Fellow at Oxford University from 2003 to 2007. Couzin then moved on to faculty positions at Princeton University and then the Max Planck Institute for Ornithology, and subsequently the Max Planck Institute of Animal Behavior in Konstanz.

== Research ==
Couzin's work is aimed at understanding how collective behaviour in animals emerges, using a combination of fieldwork, computer simulations, lab experiments, and mathematical models. His work with army ants showed how they move forming traffic lanes that optimizes their movement and avoids congestion.

His work has been featured on the New York Times, Wall Street Journal, TIME, and BBC news.

== Awards and recognition ==
In recognition of his work, he has received several awards including the Searle Scholar Award in 2008, the Mohammed Dahleh Award in 2009, the National Geographic Emerging Explorer Award in 2012, the Scientific Medal of the Zoological Society of London in 2013, the Lagrange Prize in 2019, and most recently the Falling Walls Life Sciences Prize and the Leibniz Prize in 2022. He was elected a Fellow of the Royal Society in 2025.
