= Mark Buchanan =

American physicist and author

Mark Buchanan (born October 31, 1961, in Cleveland, Ohio) is an American outreach physicist and author. He was formerly an editor with the international journal of science Nature, and the popular science magazine New Scientist. He has been a guest columnist for the New York Times, and currently writes a monthly column for the journal Nature Physics.

Buchanan's books and articles typically explore ideas of modern physics, especially in quantum theory or condensed matter physics, with an emphasis on efforts to use novel concepts from physics to understand patterns and dynamics elsewhere, especially in biology or in the human social sciences. Key themes include, but are not limited to the (often overlooked) importance of spontaneous order or self-organization in collective, complex systems. All of his work aims to bring technical advances in modern science to a broad, non-technical audience, and to help stimulate the flow of ideas across disciplinary boundaries.

He has been awarded, in June 2009, the Lagrange Prize in Turin, regarding science writing in the field of complexity.

== Books ==
1. Ubiquity: The Science of History… or Why the World is Simpler Than We Think (Weidenfeld & Nicolson, London, 2000); short-listed for the Guardian First Book Award.
2. Nexus: Small Worlds and the New Science of Networks (W.W. Norton & Co, New York, 2002); short-listed for the Aventis Science Writing Prize in 2003.
3. The Social Atom (Bloomsbury Press, New York, 2007).
4. Forecast: What Physics, Meteorology, and the Natural Sciences Can Teach Us About Economics ( Bloomsbury Publishing Plc, London 2013)
