= Renaud Lambiotte =

Belgian mathematician

- Born: Namur, Belgium
- Education: Université libre de Bruxelles (MS, PhD)
- Occupations: Mathematician, Physicist
- Known for: Complex networks, Community detection
- Scientific career
- Workplaces: University of Oxford, Somerville College
- Thesis: Inelastic Gases: A Paradigm for Far-from-equilibrium Systems (2004)
- Doctoral advisor: Leon Brenig

Renaud Lambiotte is a Belgian mathematician and physicist who is currently the Professor of Networks and Nonlinear Systems at the Mathematical Institute, University of Oxford, and a tutorial fellow at Somerville College, University of Oxford. He has contributed to the field of complex networks. He became a fellow of the Network Science Society in 2025.

== Career ==
Born in Namur, Belgium, Lambiotte went on to study physics at Université libre de Bruxelles, graduating with a Master's degree. He completed his PhD in 2004 with a thesis entitled Inelastic Gases: A Paradigm for Far-from-equilibrium Systems, supervised by Léon Brenig. Following this, Lambiotte completed post-docs at ENS Lyon, the University of Liège, UC Louvain, and Imperial College London where he pivoted to the study of complex networks. In 2011, he joined the faculty at the Department of Mathematics at the University of Namur and the Namur Institute For Complex Systems as an Assistant Professor, becoming Professor in 2014. In 2017, he moved to the Mathematical Institute at the University of Oxford as an Associate Professor, becoming Professor in 2020.

In 2015, he shared the Verdickt-Rijdams Prize from the Académie royale de langue et de littérature françaises de Belgique for La tortue de Zénon, a book collection on the relations between science and literature.

== Research ==
Lambiotte has made contributions to both theoretical and applied topics in network science. His research has focused on network dynamics with applications to brain networks and social networks. He is a co-author of the books A Guide to Temporal Networks with Naoki Masuda and Modularity and Dynamics on Complex Networks with Michael Schaub.

=== Community detection ===
Lambiotte has made contributions to the problem of community detection in complex networks. Whilst at UCLouvain, he was a co-author of the Louvain method, an algorithm for maximising modularity, which has gone on to be to cited more than 20,000 times.

Since then, he has made additional contributions such as the use of random walks and Markov chains to discover community structure, including approaches to directed, signed, higher-order and temporal networks.

=== Random walks ===
Lambiotte has made contributions to the study of random walks on networks. In particular, how random walks can reveal community structure in networks, non-Markovian random walks, and walks on temporal networks.

=== Brain networks ===
Lambiotte has made contributions to the study of both the structure and dynamics of brain networks, in particular the modular organisation of the brain.

=== Higher-order networks ===
Lambiotte has studied the dynamics of higher-order networks, such as multiplex networks, temporal networks and hypergraphs.

=== Social networks ===
Lambiotte has made contributions to the field of social network analysis including analysis of mobile phone data, online social networks, and signed networks.
