= Sara Solla =

Argentine-American physicist and neuroscientist

Sara A. Solla is an Argentine-American physicist and neuroscientist whose research applies ideas from statistical mechanics to problems involving neural networks, machine learning, and neuroscience. She is a professor of physics and of physiology at Northwestern University.

== Education and career ==
Solla is originally from Buenos Aires, and earned a licenciatura in physics in 1974 from the University of Buenos Aires. She completed a Ph.D. in physics in 1982 at the University of Washington.

She became a postdoctoral researcher at Cornell University and at the Thomas J. Watson Research Center of IBM Research. Influenced to work in neural networks by a talk from John Hopfield at Cornell, she became a researcher in the neural networks group at Bell Labs. She took her present position at Northwestern University in 1997.

== Recognition ==
Solla is a Member of the American Academy of Arts and Sciences (AAAS), and a Fellow of the American Physical Society (APS), Division of Biological Physics, "for applications of statistical physics to problems concerning learning, adaptation, and information coding in neural systems".
