= Luís Amaral =

Portuguese physicist (born 1968)

Luís A. N. Amaral
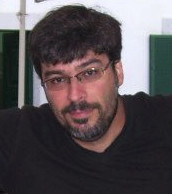
- Born: Luís A. Nunes Amaral; 12 July 1968 (age 58)
- Citizenship: Portuguese
- Education: University of Lisbon (BS, MS); Boston University (Ph.D.)
- Occupation: Physicist
- Known for: his research of network theory

Luís A. N. Amaral (born 12 July 1968) is a Portuguese physicist recognized for his research in complex systems and complex networks. His specific research interests include the emergence, evolution, and stability of complex social and biological systems. He is best known for his work in network classification and cartographic methods for uncovering the organization of complex networks. He is currently professor at McCormick School of Engineering and Feinberg School of Medicine, Northwestern University.

== Education ==
Amaral received both his bachelor's and master's degrees in physics from the University of Lisbon in 1990 and 1992, respectively. He then went to Boston, where he performed his doctoral work under the supervision of H. Eugene Stanley at Boston University, and received his doctoral degree in physics in 1996. He was a postdoctoral researcher at Forschungszentrum Jülich, MIT, Boston University, and Harvard Medical School. In 2002, he became a professor at Northwestern University.

== Academic career ==
Amaral has published over one hundred fifty scientific peer-reviewed papers in leading scientific journals, with more than twelve thousand citations. His research has been featured in many media sources. He is currently editor of several academic journals including Journal of Statistical Mechanics: Theory and Experiment and PLoS ONE. He also serves as the graduate program director at the Department of Chemical Engineering at Northwestern University. He was expected to become the co-director of Northwestern Institute on Complex Systems (NICO) in the fall of 2013.

== Entrepreneurship ==
Amaral is the co-founder and scientific advisor of Chimu Solutions, Inc. The company's main product, Footballrrating.com, tracks the performance of soccer teams and individual players. The technique is based on a paper co-authored by Amaral and the other co-founder of the company, Jordi Duch.

== Personal life ==
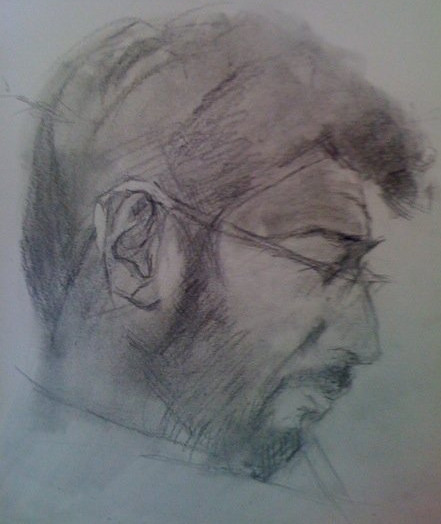
A sketch of Luís Amaral by his wife, Sarah Kaiser, an artist

Professor Amaral currently lives in the city of Evanston with his wife and his two sons, Jordi and Ferran. Apart from science, he is interested in food and history. He is also an avid soccer fan, particularly for the Portugal national soccer team and Sport Lisboa e Benfica.

== Awards and honors ==
- Fellow, American Physical Society (2014)
- Fellow, American Association for the Advancement of Science (2012)
- Invited Participant in NAE Japan-American Frontiers of Engineerium Symposium, National Academy of Engineering (2009)
- Member of Advisory Board on "Complex Systems", James S. McDonnell Foundation (2009)
- Early Career Scientist, Howard Hughes Medical Institute (2009)
- Invited Participant, NA-Keck Futures Initiative on Complex Systems, National Academies and W. M. Keck Foundation (2008)
- Distinguished Young Scholar in Medical Research, W. M. Keck Foundation (2006)
- Invited Participant on Workshop on Transformative Research, National Science Board (2005)
- Invited speaker at German-American Frontiers of Science Symposium, National Academy of Sciences and Humboldt Foundation (2005)
- Organizer, 11th Annual Frontiers of Engineering Symposium, National Academy of Engineering (2005)
- K-25 Career Award, NIGMS/NIH (2004)
- Invited participant in 10th Annual Frontiers of Engineering Symposium, National Academy of Engineering (2004)
- Invited participant in 9th Annual Frontiers of Engineering Symposium, National Academy of Engineering (2003)
- Searle Leadership Fund Award, Northwestern University (2002)
- Postdoctoral Fellowship (2 years), Fundação para a Ciência e Tecnologia, Portugal (1997)
- Postdoctoral Fellowship (15 months), DFG, Germany (1995)
- Pre-doctoral Fellowship (3 years), JNICT, Portugal (1992)
- Pre-doctoral Masters Fellowship (2 years), JNICT, Portugal (1990)
- Scholarship (10 years), Fundação Calouste Gulbenkian, Portugal (1981)

== Selected publications ==
- Malmgren, R.D.; Ottino, J.M.; Amaral, L.A.N. (2010). "The role of mentorship in protégé performance". Nature. 463 (7298): 622–626. arXiv:1006.2312. Bibcode:2010Natur.465..622M. doi:10.1038/nature09040. PMC 6697046. PMID 20520715.
- Malmgren, R.D.; Stouffer, D.B.; Campanharo, A.S.L.O.; Amaral, L.A.N. (2009). "On Universality in Human Correspondence Activity". Science. 325 (5948): 1696–1700. arXiv:0909.4724. Bibcode:2009Sci...325.1696M. doi:10.1126/science.1174562. PMID 19779200. S2CID 17531874.
- Malmgren, R.D.; Stouffer, D.B.; Motter, A.E.; Amaral, L.A.N. (2008). "A Poissonian explanation for heavy tails in e-mail communication". Proc. Natl. Acad. Sci. U.S.A. 105 (47): 18153–18158. arXiv:0901.0585. Bibcode:2008PNAS..10518153M. doi:10.1073/pnas.0800332105. PMC 2587567. PMID 19017788.
- Sales-Pardo, M.; Guimera, R.; Moreira, A.A.; Amaral, L.A.N. (2007). "Extracting the hierarchical organization of complex systems". Proc. Natl. Acad. Sci. U.S.A. 104 (39): 15224–15229. arXiv:0705.1679. Bibcode:2007PNAS..10415224S. doi:10.1073/pnas.0703740104. PMC 2000510. PMID 17881571.
- Guimera, R.; Mossa, S.; Turtschi, A.; Amaral, L.A.N. (2005). "The worldwide air transportation network: Anomalous centrality, community structure, and cities' global roles". Proc. Natl. Acad. Sci. U.S.A. 102 (22): 7794–7799. arXiv:cond-mat/0312535. Bibcode:2005PNAS..102.7794G. doi:10.1073/pnas.0407994102. PMC 1142352. PMID 15911778.
- Guimera, R.; Uzzi, B.; Spiro, J.; Amaral, L.A.N. (2005). "Team assembly mechanisms determine collaboration network structure and team performance". Science. 308 (5722): 697–702. Bibcode:2005Sci...308..697G. doi:10.1126/science.1106340. PMC 2128751. PMID 15860629.
- Guimera, R.; Amaral, L.A.N. (2005). "Functional cartography of complex metabolic networks". Nature. 433 (7028): 895–900. arXiv:q-bio/0502035. Bibcode:2005Natur.433..895G. doi:10.1038/nature03288. PMC 2175124. PMID 15729348.
- Liljeros, F.; Edling, C.R.; Amaral, L.A.N.; Stanley, H.E.; Aberg, Y. (2001). "The web of human sexual contacts". Nature. 411 (6840): 907–908. arXiv:cond-mat/0106507. Bibcode:2001Natur.411..907L. doi:10.1038/35082140. PMID 11418846. S2CID 14559344.
- Amaral, L.A.N.; Scala, A.; Barthelemy, M.; Stanley, H.E. (2000). "Classes of small-world networks". Proc. Natl. Acad. Sci. U.S.A. 97 (21): 11149–11152. arXiv:cond-mat/0001458. Bibcode:2000PNAS...9711149A. doi:10.1073/pnas.200327197. PMC 17168. PMID 11005838.
