= Marta Sales-Pardo =

Spanish statistical physicist

- Education: University of Barcelona (BS); University of Barcelona (PhD)
- Awards: Fulbright scholar
- Scientific career
- Fields: Network science; Computational biology; Complex systems
- Workplaces: Northwestern University; Universitat Rovira i Virgili
- Doctoral advisor: Felix Ritort

Marta Sales-Pardo (born 1976) is a Spanish statistical physicist, complex systems scientist, and network scientist. She is an associate professor at Rovira i Virgili University, in the Department of Chemical Engineering. She is notable for her contributions to complex networks, where she has studied both social and biochemical systems, especially the contribution of each node or individual to the overall network. Her research has earned several mentions in the Fulbright Program and the ICREA Program, among others.

== Education and career ==
Sales-Pardo earned a Bachelors of Science in physics from the University of Barcelona in 1998. She then earned a PhD in physics from the University of Barcelona in 2002, advised by Felix Ritort. In 2003, she became a post-doctoral fellow at the Chemical and Biological Engineering Department at Northwestern University. She obtained the Fulbright scholarship in 2004 for two years, and in 2008 became a research assistant professor at Northwestern University. Since 2010, she has been an associate professor at Rovira i Virgili University.

== Research ==
Sales-Pardo is most well known for her studies on complex networks, including a paper studying the statistical significance of modularity in randomly-generated complex networks. Her most cited works discuss how to mine data from large complex networks accurately, successfully capturing the properties of the mined distribution.

== Recognition ==
In 2021, Sales-Pardo was named a Fellow of the Network Science Society, "for her contributions to the understanding of the organisation of large-scale networks and the development of generative models and inference methodologies for complex networks". She was the first Spanish woman to win this honor.
