= Sonia Kéfi =

Ecologist

Sonia Kéfi is a network scientist and systems ecologist who studies ecosystem dynamics and the resilience of ecosystems to climate change and human land use. She works for the French National Centre for Scientific Research (CNRS) in the Institut des Sciences de l’Evolution de Montpellier, associated with the University of Montpellier, and is also affiliated as an external professor with the Santa Fe Institute.

== Education and career ==
Kéfi earned her Ph.D. in 2008 from Utrecht University in the Netherlands, and then did postdoctoral research as a Humboldt Fellow at Technische Universität Darmstadt in Germany before joining CNRS in 2011.

== Recognition ==
Kéfi won the 2011 Martinus van Marum Prize of the Koninklijke Hollandsche Maatschappij der Wetenschappen (Royal Holland Society of Sciences and Humanities). She won the CNRS Bronze Medal in 2017, and the Erdős–Rényi Prize of the Network Science Society in 2020, "for foundational and empirically grounded theoretical research that has advanced network science and its applications in ecology, with a focus on multiple types of interactions among species and the implications for global change, opening the path to new ways to study ecosystems".
