= Vito Latora =

Italian physicist

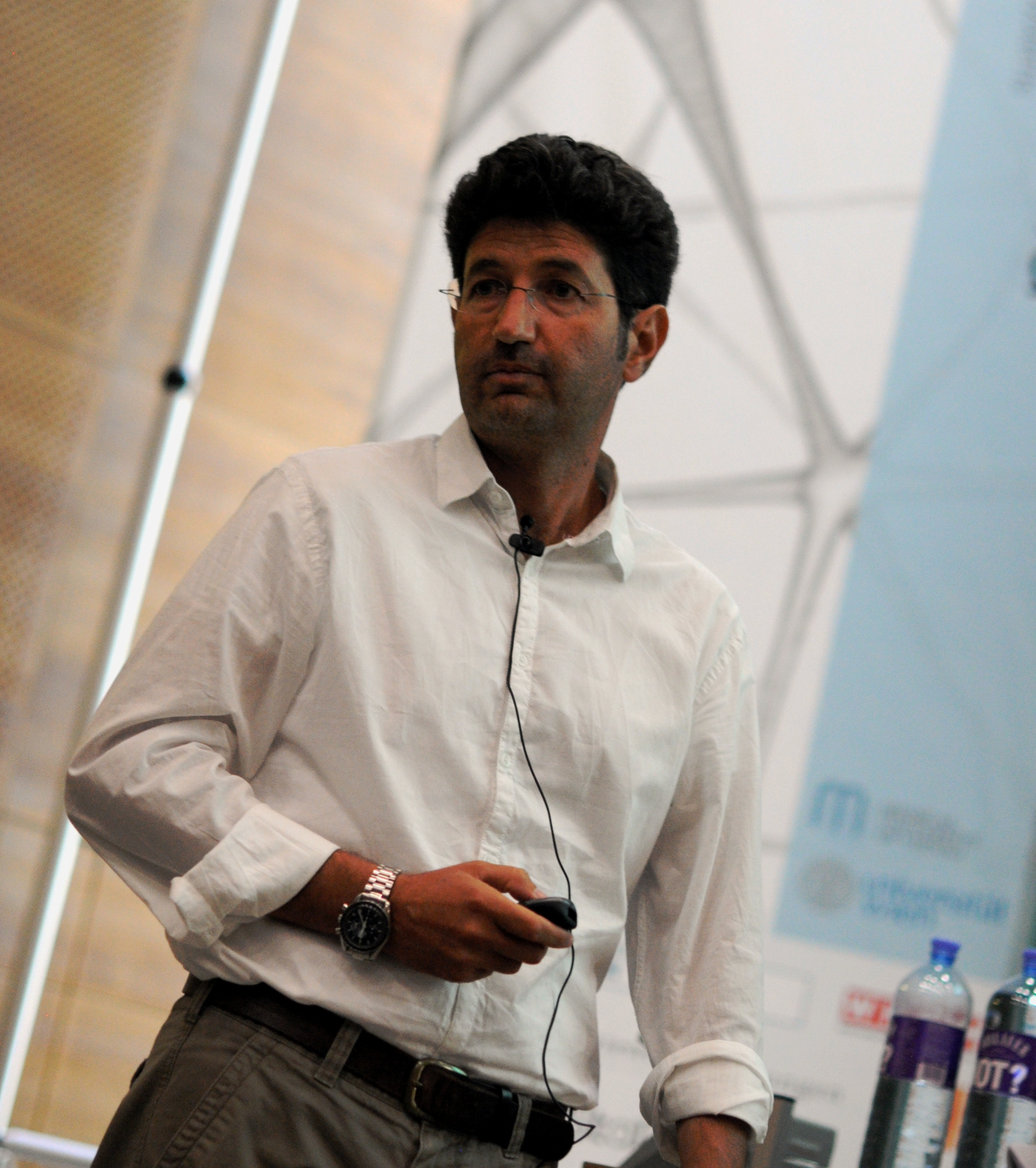
- Vito Latora during his talk at the 2011 European Conference on Complex Systems
- Born: Vito Claudio Latora; 23 April 1969 (age 57); Italy
- Education: University of Catania (Ph.D)
- Occupation: Physicist
- Known for: his work in the research of network theory the concept of network efficiency
- Awards: Fellow of the Network Science Society (NetSci), 2021. Fellow of the American Physical Society (APS), 2026

Vito Latora is an Italian physicist, currently Professor in Applied Mathematics (Chair of Complex Systems) at the School of Mathematical Sciences of the Queen Mary University of London. He is known for his works on complex systems, in particular on the structure and dynamics of complex networks.

== Career ==
Latora received a PhD in physics from the University of Catania in Italy for a thesis in the field of theoretical nuclear physics entitled "Multifragmentation, phase transitions and critical chaos in hot nuclei". He conducted postdoctoral research at Massachusetts Institute of Technology (MIT) in the group of Michel Baranger, in the group of Eric Heller at Harvard University, and at Paris University XI. After his postdoctoral period, he joined the department of Physics of the University of Catania as an assistant professor in 2002. Since 2012, Vito Latora is Full Professor in Applied Mathematics (chair in Complex Systems) at the Queen Mary University of London.

== Research ==
After initial work in the field of theoretical nuclear physics, his scientific contributions have focused on statistical physics, complex systems and, especially, complex networks. Noteworthy, he has developed together with Massimo Marchiori the so-called "network efficiency", a topological measure that accounts for the capability of a system to deliver information, or goods, spending the least amount of resources. He is also well known for his works on spatial systems and in particular on urban street networks. His other contributions span a wide range of subjects ranging from statistical mechanics, to neuroscience, and social science. As of March 2014, he is author of about 150 scientific papers and his h-index is equal to 50 according to Google Scholar., 38 according to Web of Science, and 37 according to Scopus. He coauthored a review article entitled "Complex networks: Structure and dynamics" published in 2006 in Physics Reports that has accrued more than 4500 citations and is the most cited and downloaded article in the history of Physics Reports. His work has been featured in many venues, including being on the cover of the Physical Review Letters issue of 19 March 2010

He is editor of the Journal of Complex Networks since 2013. He is also member of the advisory board of Chaos, a scientific journal of the American Institute of Physics.

== Awards ==
In 2008, Latora has been awarded with the "Giovan Pietro Grimaldi Prize". The motivation of the prize was: "For his works on the structure and dynamics of complex networks".

In 2021, Latora has been nominated fellow of the Network Science Society with the following citation: "For seminal work on the structure and dynamics of temporal, multilayer, and higher-order networks, and innovative applications of network science to other disciplines, including neuroscience and urban design."

In 2026, Latora has been nominated fellow of the American Physical Society with the following citation: "For pioneering contributions to the statistical physics of complex networks, including foundational work on network efficiency, cascading failures, multilayer networks, and higher-order interactions."
