= Eckehard Schöll =

German physicist and mathematician (born 1951)

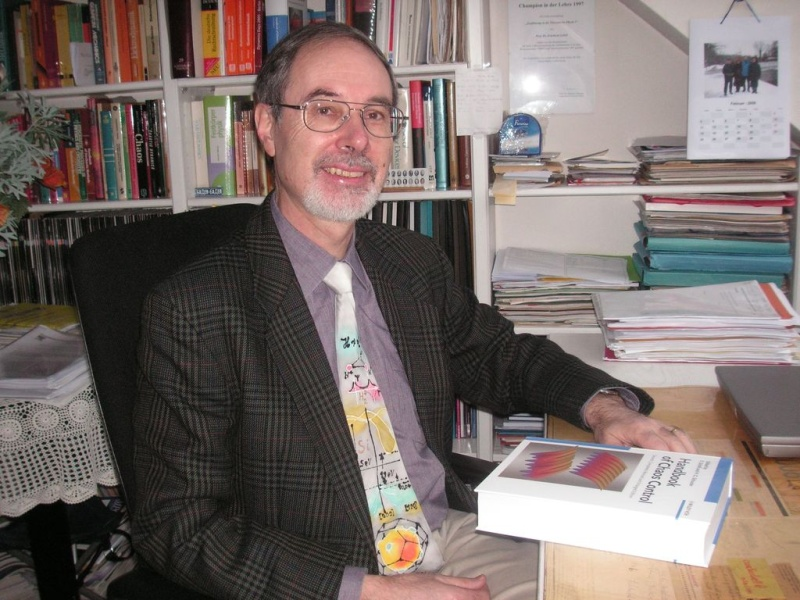
- Eckehard Schöll in his office
- Born: 6 February 1951 (age 75); Stuttgart
- Education: RWTH Aachen University (1981, PhD in Physics); University of Southampton (1978, PhD in Mathematics); University of Tübingen (1976, Diplom in Physics)
- Known for: Nonlinear dynamics
- Awards: Fulbright Senior Scholarship
- Scientific career
- Fields: Theoretical physics
- Workplaces: Technische Universität Berlin

Eckehard Schöll (born 6 February 1951) is a German physicist and mathematician as well as a professor of theoretical physics at Technische Universität Berlin. He is an expert in the field of nonlinear dynamics and head of the group Nonlinear dynamics and control. His work pertains to research in the fields of mathematics and physics, particularly semiconductor physics, neurodynamics and bifurcation theory. His latest research is also related to topics in biology and the social sciences, e.g. simulation of the dynamics in socioeconomic or neuronal networks. He is one of the forerunners into the research of chimera states.

Eckehard Schöll is the author of over 580 publications in scientific journals, three books (Nonequilibrium Phase Transitions in Semiconductors (Springer 1987), The Physics of Instabilities in Solid State Electron Devices (Plenum Press, New York, 1992), and Nonlinear Spatio-Temporal Dynamics and Chaos in Semiconductors (Cambridge University Press 2001)) as well as editor of several books. His Hirsch index is 76 (as of 2023) and his Einstein number is 5.

== Life and career ==
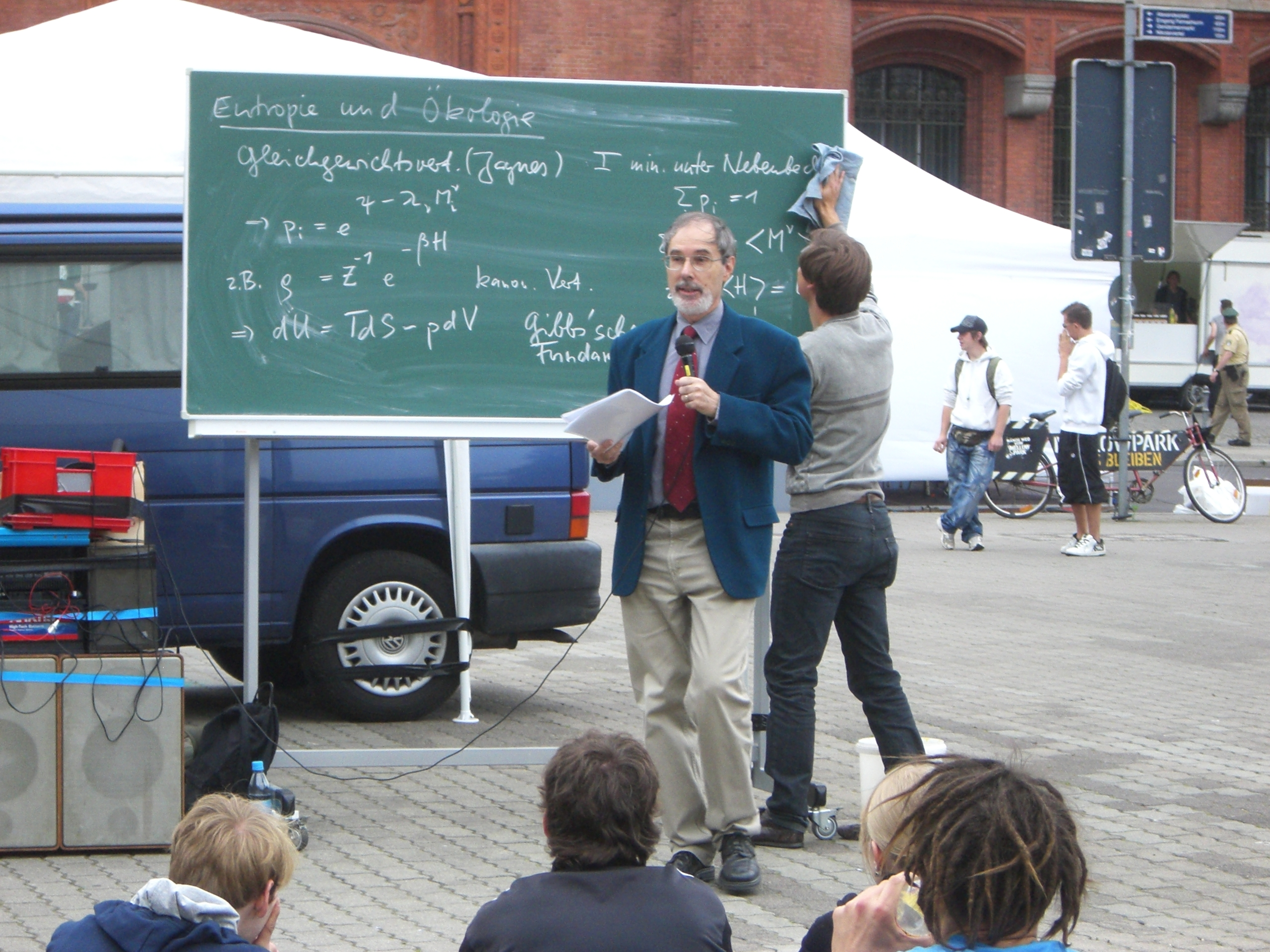
Eckehard Schöll 2009 at a protest lecture in front of the Roten Rathaus during the students strike.

Since 1989 Eckehard Schöll is Hochschulprofessor at Technische Universität Berlin where to date he has supervised 100 Diplom-, Master- und Bachelor theses, 30 PhD theses und 2 habilitations. He studied physics at the University of Tübingen (Diplom 1976) and graduated with a PhD in mathematics in 1978 from the University of Southampton (UK, doctoral advisor P. T. Landsberg). He completed a Dr. rer. nat. in 1981 under the supervision of Friedrich Schlögl at the RWTH Aachen University. He was a visiting assistant professor at the Wayne State University in Detroit, USA (1983–1984) and afterwards a guest scientist at the University of Florida, USA (1985). He finished is habilitation in 1986. He has been involved in several collaborative research centers and was head of the collaborative research center SFB 910 of the Deutsche Forschungsgemeinschaft (DFG) with the topic Control of Self-Organizing Nonlinear Systems. Eckehard Schöll is involved with the Studienstiftung des deutschen Volkes, and part of the election committee of the Fulbright Program. Since 2020 he is Guest Scientist at Potsdam Institute for Climate Impact Research.

Eckehard Schöll is married with two children and has one grandchild.

== Awards and distinctions ==
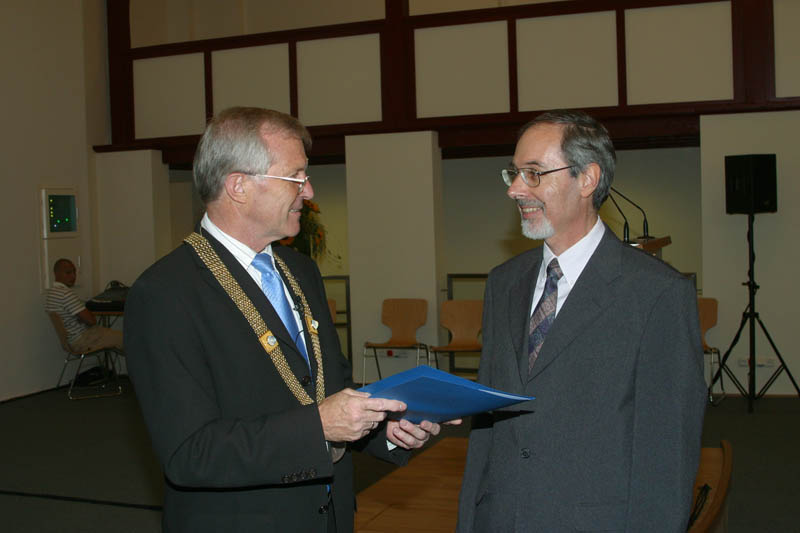
2007 25th PhD Anniversary of Eckehard Schöll, Presentation of the Renewal Certificate

Eckehard Schöll was scholar of Studienstiftung des deutschen Volkes between 1971 und 1978. In 1997 he was awarded champion of teaching from TU Berlin for his well structured and informative lectures. In 2000 he received a Fulbright Senior Scholarship Award (Duke University, USA), as well as a Visiting Professorship of the London Mathematical Society in 2004. In 2017 he was awarded an honorary doctorate of the Saratov State University, Russia.

=== Conferences ===
Being an active member of the scientific community, Eckehard Schöll has been involved in the organization of several international scientific conferences

- Short Thematic Program on Delay Differential Equations, Toronto 2015,
- Control of Self-Organizing Nonlinear Systems, Warnemünde 2014,
- Delayed Complex Systems, Palma de Mallorca 2012
- Delayed Complex Systems, Dresden 2009
- Local conference director of the 72., 76., and 79. DPG-Spring Meeting of the condensed matter section in Berlin

== Works ==
- Control of self-organizing nonlinear systems. Cham: Springer. 2016. ISBN 978-3-319-28028-8. OCLC 936204208.
- Schöll, Eckehard; Schuster, Heinz Georg, eds. (24 October 2007). Handbook of Chaos Control. Wiley. doi:10.1002/9783527622313. ISBN 978-3-527-40605-0.
- Schöll, Eckehard (22 February 2001). Nonlinear Spatio-Temporal Dynamics and Chaos in Semiconductors. Cambridge University Press. doi:10.1017/cbo9780511524615. ISBN 978-0-521-45186-4.
- Theory of transport properties of semiconductor nanostructures. London New York: Chapman & Hall. 1998. ISBN 978-1-4615-5807-1. OCLC 883391927.
- Nonequilibrium Phase Transitions in Semiconductors : Self-Organization Induced by Generation and Recombination Processes. Berlin, Heidelberg: Springer Berlin Heidelberg. 1987. ISBN 978-3-642-71927-1. OCLC 851840691.

Main research

- Dynamics of networks, synchronization patterns and Chimera-states
- Chaos and noise in dynamical systems
- Analysis of dynamical systems with time delay and the control thereof.
- Nonlinear dynamics of semiconductor lasers
- Nonlinear carrier transport in semiconductor nanosstructures
- Self organization, growth kinetics and Monte-Carlo-simulations
