= Mason Porter =

American mathematician

- Porter at Worldcon 2026
- Born: 10 February 1976 (age 50); Los Angeles, California
- Education: Cornell University, California Institute of Technology
- Known for: Work on Network science
- Awards: Erdös-Rényi Prize in Network Science (2014); Whitehead Prize (2015)
- Scientific career
- Fields: Mathematics, Physics, Sociology
- Workplaces: University of California at Los Angeles, Somerville College, Oxford, Georgia Institute of Technology
- Thesis: Quantum chaos in vibrating billiard systems (2002)
- Doctoral advisor: Richard Liboff

Mason A. Porter (born 1976) is an American mathematician, physicist, and social scientist. He is currently a professor of complex systems at Nordita and Stockholm University. Previously, he worked at the University of California, Los Angeles.

He is an Elected Fellow of the American Physical Society. He was elected to the 2018 class of fellows of the American Mathematical Society.

== Early life and education ==
Mason Porter was born in 1976 in Los Angeles. He completed his studies at Beverly Hills High School in 1994 as the salutatorian of his class. Afterward, he attended California Institute of Technology, where he was a member of Lloyd House. In 1998, he graduated in with a Bachelor of Science (Honours degree) in Applied Mathematics. For his graduate studies, he went to the Center for Applied Mathematics at Cornell University, where he worked on quantum billiards. He was supervised by Richard Liboff and graduated in 2002 with a PhD.

== Career ==
Subsequently, Mason Porter had postdoctoral scholar positions at the Georgia Institute of Technology, the Mathematical Sciences Research Institute in Berkeley, and the California Institute of Technology. From 2007 to 2016, he was a faculty member of the Mathematical Institute, University of Oxford and a Tutorial fellow at Somerville College, Oxford. Currently, he is a professor of mathematics and sociology at the University of California, Los Angeles.

He has been working on a range of topics in applied and theoretical mathematics. These include community structure in multidimensional networks, dynamical systems, granular material, topological data analysis, and social network analysis. His collaborators include Danielle Bassett, Andrea Bertozzi, Charlotte Deane, and Heather Harrington.

== Awards and honors ==
In 2014, he received an Erdős–Rényi Prize, recognizing his work on the mathematics of networks and his outreach efforts. In 2015, he was awarded a Whitehead Prize by the London Mathematical Society in recognition of his interdisciplinary research, particularly the detection of communities in networks. He is a fellow of the American Mathematical Society and an Elected Fellow of the American Physical Society. In 2016, he was awarded a Young Scientist Award for Socio- and Econophysics by the Deutsche Physikalische Gesellschaft. In 2019 he was named a SIAM Fellow "for contributions to diverse problems and applications in networks, complex systems, and nonlinear systems".

== Trivia ==
Mason Porter writes a blog called Quantum Chaotic Thoughts. From 2016 onwards, he has been a Top Writer on Quora. He is a fan of the Los Angeles Dodgers.
