= Guido Caldarelli =

Italian scientist (born 1967)

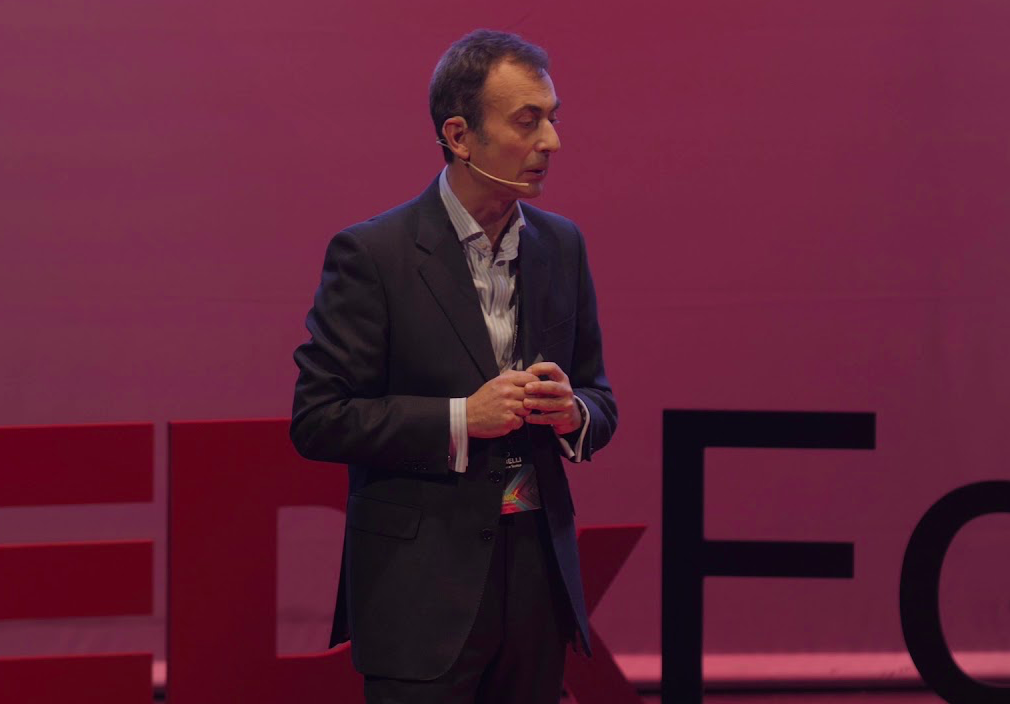
- Caldarelli in 2018
- Education: Sapienza University of Rome; SISSA
- Known for: President of Complex Systems Society complex networks
- Scientific career
- Workplaces: Ca' Foscari University of Venice; IMT School for Advanced Studies Lucca; University of Manchester; University of Cambridge

Guido Caldarelli (born in 1967) is an Italian physicist (statistical physics) and full professor in Theoretical Physics at Ca' Foscari University of Venice. From 2024 he is Director of the Institute of Complex Systems of the National Research Council of Italy

== Biography ==
Caldarelli received his Ph.D. from SISSA, after which he was a postdoc in the Department of Physics and School of Biology, University of Manchester. He then worked at the Theory of Condensed Matter Group, University of Cambridge, where he worked with Robin Ball. He returned to Italy as a lecturer at the National Institute for Condensed Matter (INFM) and later as Primo Ricercatore in the Institute of Complex Systems of the National Research Council of Italy. During this period, he was also the coordinator of the Networks subproject, part of the Complexity Project, for the Fermi Centre. From 2012 to 2020, he was a professor at IMT School for Advanced Studies Lucca. He also spent some terms at University of Fribourg (Switzerland) and across 2003–2004, he has been visiting professor at École Normale Supérieure in Paris.

In CCS2018 (The Conference of Complex Systems Society), he was elected President of the Complex Systems Society for the mandate 2018–2021.

From July 1, 2024, he is the Director of the Institute of Complex Systems of National Research Council (Italy).

== Research ==
The activity of Caldarelli is mainly focused on scale-free networks, complex networks in theoretical models and in their application to financial networks. He has been coordinator of the European project COSIN, one of the first international activities based on the study of complex networks as well as coordinator of the European project FOC on the study of financial networks and the project MULTIPLEX on Multi-level Complex Networks. All this activity contributed to the creation of network science community in the early stage of this discipline.

He has published numerous papers in physics and interdisciplinary journals, including Physical Review Letters and Nature. His work on beauty and the stable marriage problem has been reported in the press. He is also known for his research activity on systemic risk in networks of financial institutions.

== Honours ==
- 2019, Caldarelli has been awarded with the Network Society Fellowship
- 2020, with the Network Society Service Award.
- 2020, he has been elected Fellow of the American Physical Society.,
- 2020, he has been elected Member of the Academia Europaea.
- 2023, he has been awarded the Service Award from the Complex Systems Society.
- 2025, he has been awarded the Senior Scientific Award from the Complex Systems Society.

== Books ==
Caldarelli is the author of Scale-free networks a textbook for graduate students published by Oxford University Press. He also edited with World Scientific Press and Alessandro Vespignani another book Large Scale Structure and Dynamics of Complex Networks on the activity of COSIN project. In 2012, he published together with the colleague and journalist Michele Catanzaro the book Networks: A Very Short Introduction by Oxford University Press. In 2016, he published with Alessandro Chessa the book Data Science and Complex Networks by the same publisher. In 2018 he edited together with Stefano Battiston and Antonios Garas the book Multiplex and Multilevel Networks again by Oxford University Press. He also coedited the book Networks in Cell Biology by Cambridge University Press.
