= Computational epidemiology =

Computational epidemiology is a multidisciplinary field that uses techniques from computer science, mathematics, geographic information science and public health to better understand issues central to epidemiology such as the spread of diseases or the effectiveness of a public health intervention. Computational epidemiology traces its origins to mathematical epidemiology, but began to experience significant growth with the rise of big data and the democratization of high-performance computing through cloud computing.

== Introduction ==
In contrast with traditional epidemiology, computational epidemiology looks for patterns in unstructured sources of data, such as social media. It can be thought of as the hypothesis-generating antecedent to hypothesis-testing methods such as national surveys and randomized controlled trials. A mathematical model is developed which describes the observed behavior of the viruses, based on the available data. Then simulations of the model are performed to understand the possible outcomes given the model used. These simulations produce as results projections which can then be used to make predictions or verify the facts and then be used to plan interventions and meters towards the control of the disease's spread.
