= Raissa D'Souza =

American computer scientist

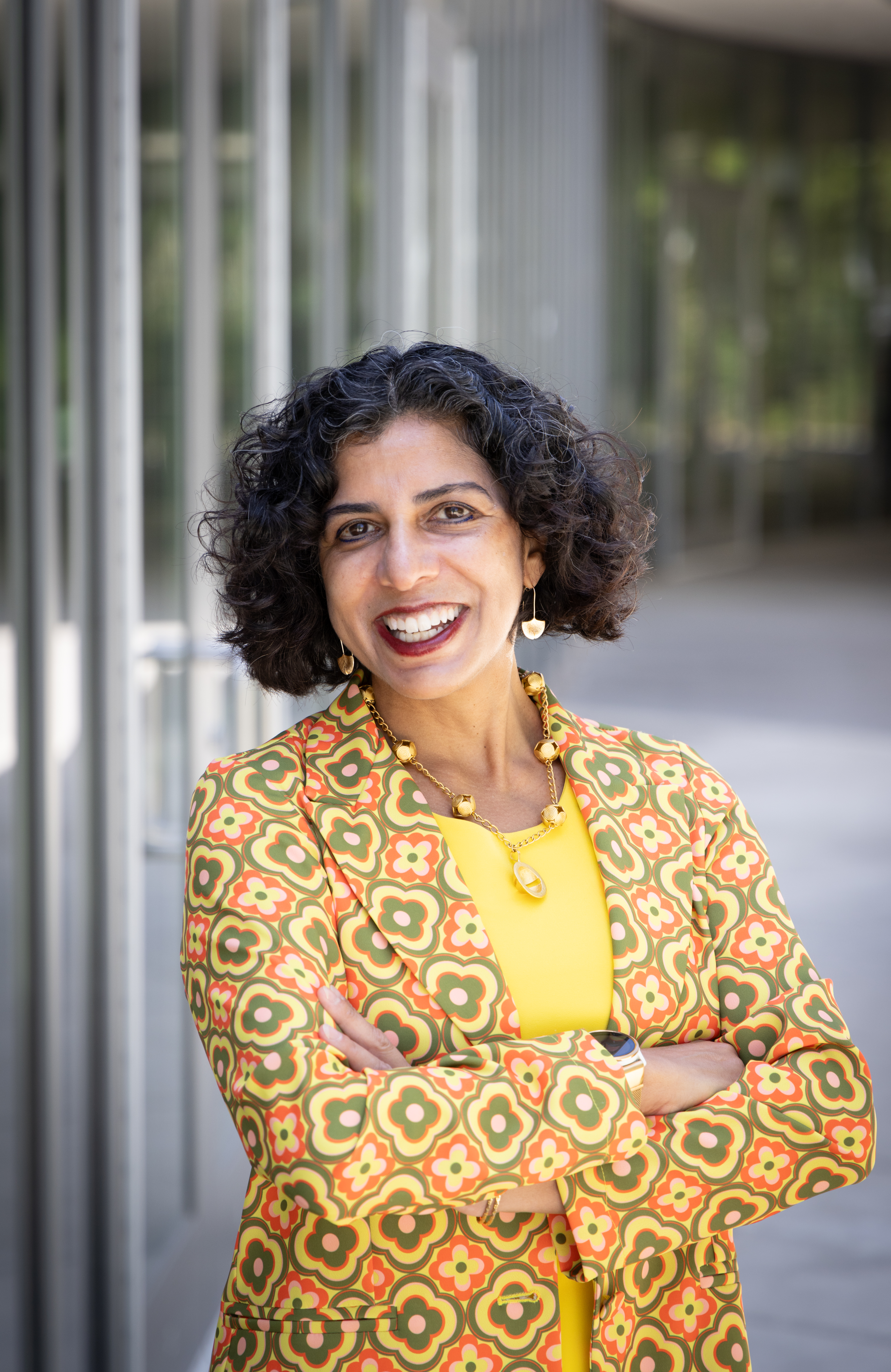
- Portrait from the University of California, Davis, taken in 2024
- Born: 1969 (age 56–57); Chicago, Illinois, United States
- Education: University of Illinois at Urbana–Champaign; Massachusetts Institute of Technology
- Awards: 2019 Euler Award in Network Science
- Scientific career
- Fields: Physics and Computer Science
- Workplaces: University of California, Davis; Bell Labs; Microsoft Research
- Academic advisors: Mehran Kardar; Norman Margolus
- Website: http://mae.engr.ucdavis.edu/dsouza/

Raissa M. D'Souza is the Associate Dean of Research for the College of Engineering and a Professor of Computer Science and Mechanical Engineering at the University of California, Davis as well as an External Professor and member of the Science Board at the Santa Fe Institute. She was elected a Fellow of the American Physical Society in 2016, Fellow of the Network Science Society in 2019, and Fellow of the American Association for the Advancement of Science in 2024. D'Souza works on theory and complex systems.

== Early life and education ==
When D'Souza was younger she faced the personal choice of going to college or moving to Paris to become a fashion designer. She eventually settled on university and studied physics at the University of Illinois at Urbana–Champaign. She earned her doctoral degree in theoretical physics at the Massachusetts Institute of Technology (MIT) in 1999, where she worked with Mehran Kardar and Norman Margolus. After graduation, she worked in both the fundamental mathematics group at Bell Labs and the Theory group at Microsoft Research. She held a visiting research position at the École Normale Supérior and the California Institute of Technology.

== Research and career ==
D'Souza was appointed as an Assistant Professor to the University of California, Davis in 2005, promoted to Associate Professor in 2008, and to Full Professor in 2013. She works on the mathematics of networks and the dynamics of how processes unfold on networks. These networks could be in technological, biological or social systems. She has studied the interaction between nodes, and how these can lead to self-organizing behaviour. She demonstrated that there exists a percolation threshold, where at a certain point a small number of additional connections can result in a considerable fraction of the network becoming connected, a phenomenon known as explosive percolation. The percolation transition can be applied to a variety of real-world systems, from nanotubes to epileptic seizures or social networks. Large-scale connectivity and synchronisation can be crucial to the structure and function of complex networks. She demonstrated that sparse connections between separate networks helps to suppress cascading failures. She has also studied cascading behaviours in general, including power-grid failures, crashes in financial markets and spreads of political movements.

In 2014 D'Souza was awarded a United States Department of Defense Multidisciplinary University Research Initiative Award to investigate the prediction and control of interdependent networks for the period 2014–2019.

=== Academic service ===
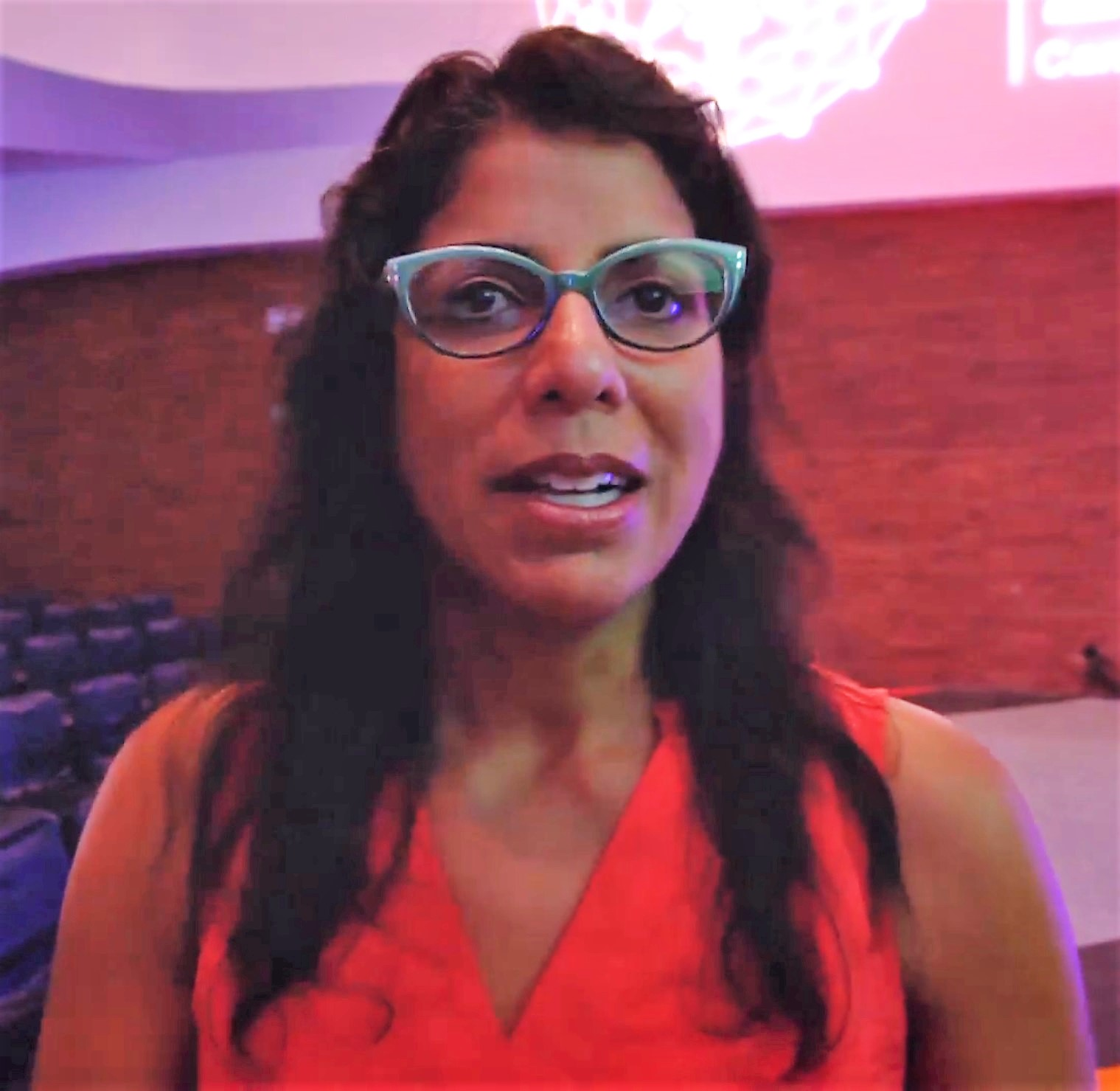
D'Souza speaks at a conference in 2017

She is an External Professor at both the Santa Fe Institute and the Complexity Science Hub Vienna. She was a Kavli Fellow of the National Academy of Sciences several times and previously served on the World Economic Forum Global Agenda Council of Complex Systems. She was made an inaugural member of the Global Young Academy in 2010. In 2015, D'Souza was appointed the 2nd President of the Network Science Society, and served in this role until 2018. In 2019, she was awarded the Network Science Society's inaugural Euler Award "for her influential contribution to the discovery and study of explosive percolation and the insights it provided to explosive synchronization and network optimization".

D'Souza serves on the Scientific Advisory Board of Quanta Magazine. She was made lead editor of the American Physical Society journal Physical Review Research in 2019. Since Aug 2020, she is a member of the Board of Reviewing Editors at Science.

=== Awards and honours ===
Her awards and honours include;

- 2015 Elected President of the Network Science Society
- 2016 Elected Fellow of the American Physical Society
- 2017 University of California, Davis Outstanding Mid-Career Faculty Research Award
- 2018 ACM Test-of-Time award (for lasting influence of paper from 2008)
- 2019 Network Science Society Euler Award
- 2019 Elected Fellow of the Network Science Society
- 2022 Outstanding Service Award of the Network Science Society
- 2024 Elected Fellow of the American Association for the Advancement of Science (AAAS)

=== Publications ===
Her publications include;

- D'Souza, Raissa M.; Gómez-Gardeñes, Jesus; Nagler, Jan; Arenas, Alex (2019). "(2019) Explosive phenomena in complex networks". Advances in Physics. 68 (3): 123–223. arXiv:1907.09957. Bibcode:2019AdPhy..68..123D. doi:10.1080/00018732.2019.1650450. S2CID 198179863.
- Achlioptas, D.; d'Souza, R. M.; Spencer, J. (2009). "(2009) Explosive percolation in random networks". Science. 323 (5920): 1453–1455. Bibcode:2009Sci...323.1453A. doi:10.1126/science.1167782. PMID 19286548. S2CID 54565131.
- "(2012) Suppressing cascades of load in interdependent networks". Proceedings of the National Academy of Sciences. 109: E680–E689. 2012.
- Bird, Christian; Pattison, David; d'Souza, Raissa; Filkov, Vladimir; Devanbu, Premkumar (2008). "Latent social structure in open source projects". Proceedings of the 16th ACM SIGSOFT International Symposium on Foundations of software engineering. Sigsoft '08/Fse-16. pp. 24–35. doi:10.1145/1453101.1453107. ISBN 9781595939951. S2CID 5839120. Winner 2018 ACM Test-of-Time award.
