= Adilson E. Motter =

American scientist (born 1974)

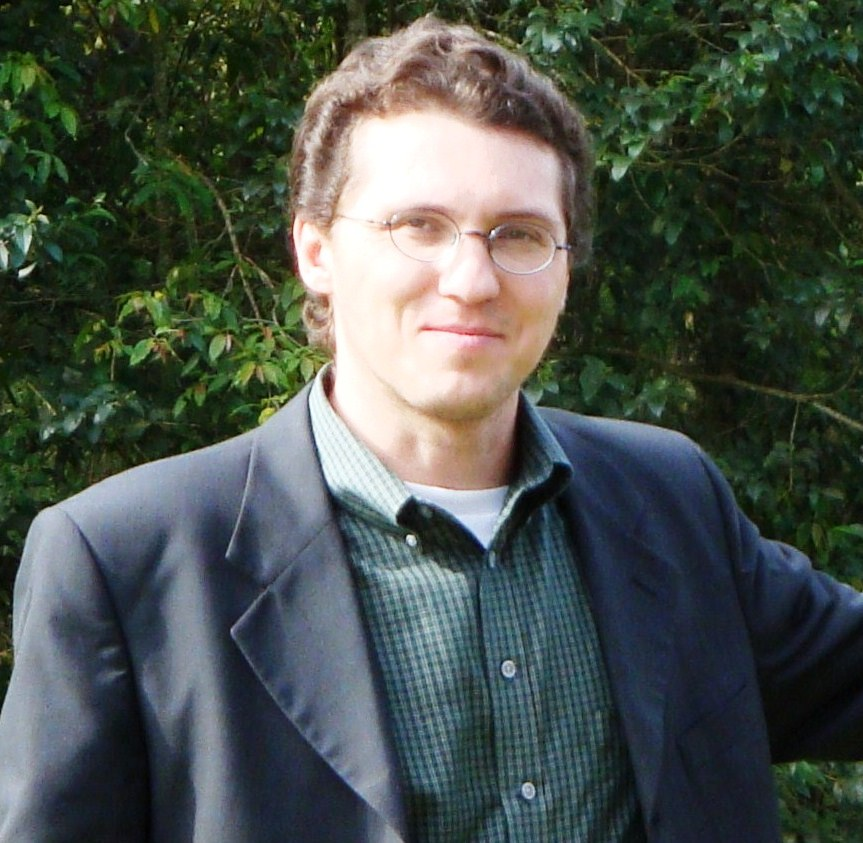
- Born: January 1, 1974 (age 52); Brazil
- Known for: Cascading failures in large-scale networks Synthetic rescues in metabolic networks Mechanical metamaterials with negative compressibility Doubly transient and relativistic chaos Converse symmetry breaking in network dynamics
- Awards: Sloan Research Fellow (2009); NSF CAREER Award (2011); APS Fellow (2013); Erdös-Rényi Prize (2013); Simons Foundation Fellow (2015); AAAS Fellow (2015); NetSci Fellow (2020); CSS Senior Scientific Award (2022)
- Scientific career
- Fields: Physics, applied math
- Workplaces: Northwestern University

Adilson E. Motter (born January 1, 1974, in Brazil) is the Charles E. and Emma H. Morrison Professor of Physics at Northwestern University, where he has helped develop the concept of synthetic rescue in network biology as well as methods to control the nonlinear dynamics of complex networks. In joint work with Takashi Nishikawa, he discovered the phenomenon of converse symmetry breaking (also referred to as asymmetry-induced symmetry). Motter's research is focused on complex systems and nonlinear phenomena, primarily involving complex networks, systems biology, chaos and statistical physics.

== Scientific activity ==
Motter has contributed to the study of nonlinear phenomena in complex systems. He and his collaborators have established conditions for the synchronization of power grids and other complex networks. Together with his former student Z. Nicolaou, he designed a class of mechanical metamaterials that exhibit longitudinal negative compressibility. He has devised local methods for cascade control in distributed systems and his team advanced the large-scale modeling of cascading failures. His group has studied implications of these methods for the recovery of lost function in biological and ecological networks and for the control of complex networks in general. His first publication in network science established the three degrees of separation for English words.

In other areas, most noticeably chaos theory, he is known for accommodating the formalism of chaos theory within general relativity. Along with colleagues, he also formalized the concept of doubly transient chaos in dissipative dynamical systems and discovered that network dynamics can exhibit sensitive dependence on network structure much in the same way chaotic dynamics exhibits sensitive dependence on initial conditions or parameters.

Together with Marc Timme, he wrote the review “Antagonistic Phenomena in Network Dynamics”, which discusses a variety of seemly paradoxical or highly counterintuitive effects in collective network dynamics.

== Awards ==
Motter is a Fellow of the American Physical Society. He was selected as a Sloan Research Fellow in 2009, received an NSF CAREER Award in 2011, and was awarded the Erdös-Rényi Prize in Network Science in 2013. In 2014 he was identified among the 30 most promising scientists under the age of 40 born in Latin America, according to a survey conducted jointly by the magazine Qué Pasa and the blog LatinAmericanScience.org. In 2015, the Simons Foundation named Motter one of their Fellows in Theoretical Physics. He is an elected Fellow of the American Association for the Advancement of Science (AAAS) and in 2020 was named a Fellow of the Network Science Society. In 2022, Motter received the Senior Scientific Award of the Complex Systems Society.
