= Dani Bassett =

American physicist

- Born: c. 1981
- Education: Pennsylvania State University (BS); University of Cambridge (PgCert, PhD)
- Children: Two sons, b. 2011 and 2014
- Awards: Sloan Research Fellowship; MacArthur fellowship Erdős–Rényi Prize; ONR Young Investigator
- Scientific career
- Fields: physics, neuroscience
- Workplaces: University of California, Santa Barbara; University of Pennsylvania
- Doctoral advisor: Thomas Duke, Edward T. Bullmore, Andreas Meyer-Lindenberg
- Website: www.danisbassett.com

Dani Smith Bassett (born c. 1981) is an American physicist and systems neuroscientist who was the youngest individual to be awarded a 2014 MacArthur fellowship. They are also the J. Peter Skirkanich Professor at the University of Pennsylvania.

Bassett, whose pronouns are they/them, was also awarded a 2014 Sloan fellowship. They are currently the J. Peter Skirkanich Professor in the Departments of Bioengineering, Electrical & Systems Engineering, Physics & Astronomy, Neurology, and Psychiatry at the University of Pennsylvania and an external professor of the Santa Fe Institute. Their work focuses on applying network science to the study of learning in the human brain in addition to the study of other complex physical and biological systems.

== Early life and education ==
Dani S. Bassett (born Danielle Perry) was born in 1981 and was raised in Lock Haven and Reading, Pennsylvania. Pursuing a passion for medicine, and following in family footsteps, Bassett began higher education in an RN program at the Reading Hospital School of Nursing. After discovering a passion for mathematics, Bassett sought to combine the concepts of physics and mathematics to neuroscience. Bassett graduated from Pennsylvania State University with a bachelor of science in physics in 2004. Basset received the NIH-Cambridge Scholarship and the Winston Churchill Scholarship and studied at the University of Cambridge. Bassett received a certificate in postgraduate studies from Churchill College, Cambridge in 2005 and a doctor of philosophy from King's College, Cambridge in 2009.

== Career ==
Dani S. Bassett became a postdoctoral associate from 2009 to 2011 at the University of California, Santa Barbara and a Sage Junior Research Fellow from 2011 to 2013. Bassett is currently on the faculty of the University of Pennsylvania as the J. Peter Skirkanich Professor in the department of bioengineering.

Bassett's early work used and developed concepts in network science and complex systems to understand the organization of the brain. Bassett focused on the "small-world" topology of the brain, which refers to networks and the way in which they express dense local clustering and how the presence of connections leads to a short path of communication between distant nodes. Bassett's research team applied mathematical concepts in graph theory to small-world analysis to quantify cortical connectivity. The small-world models Bassett produced introduced a means to understanding the brain's structure and function.

These topological measures developed early in Bassett's career were used to examine the cortex and its divisions and wiring to determine the properties that the cortex has. Bassett found that of the various cortical regions, the multimodal portion of the cortex has hierarchical organizations with low clustering, and the transmodal portion was more assortative. Bassett applied these concepts to schizophrenic individuals and noticed that the organization of these portions were abnormal with increasing connection distances. Bassett continues to research the implications of network behaviors on mental disorders, particularly schizophrenia.

Bassett also has worked with Fabio Pasqualetti (currently at University of California, Riverside) to apply control theory to the study of the brain; their initial study on the subject was published in 2015.

Bassett and their team have also been conducting research regarding brain flexibility. Brain flexibility is how often a region of the brain switches communication patterns. The more often the brain switches patterns, the more flexible the brain is. They have also found correlations between the ability for the brain to learn and the flexibility of the brain. Bassett's research may have implications in rehabilitation, particularly in patients who have had a stroke.

== Awards and honors ==
During their undergraduate studies, Bassett was the sole recipient of the Paul Axt Prize, which is given to a student who demonstrates commitment to inquiry and fosters intellectual curiosity. They were also a Schreyer Honors Scholar and were named the Most Achieving Undergraduate Woman of the Year in 2004. Bassett received the Winston Churchill Scholarship and the National Institute of Health- Cambridge Health Science Scholarship to fund their graduate education. Bassett received the Alumni Achievement Award from the Schreyer Honors College at Pennsylvania State University for extraordinary accomplishment under 35 years of age. Bassett was named American Psychological Society "Rising Star" in December 2012. In January 2014, they won the Sloan Research Fellowship. Most notably, they were one of the 21 winners of the MacArthur Research Fellowship in September 2014.

In 2016, Bassett was named one of the ten most brilliant scientists of the year by Popular Science magazine. In 2017, they received the Lagrange Prize in Complex Systems. In 2018, Bassett received the Erdős–Rényi Prize for "fundamental contributions to our understanding of the network architecture of the human brain".

Bassett was named a fellow of the American Institute for Medical and Biological Engineering in 2020 and a fellow of the American Physical Society in 2021.

== Personal life ==
Dani S. Bassett has two children. During Bassett's earlier years, they captained the crew team at King's College, Cambridge. Bassett's twin is Perry Zurn, professor at the department of philosophy at American University.

=== Books ===
- Curious Minds: The Power of Connection (2022) : Cambridge: The MIT Press. (ISBN 0262047039)

=== Articles ===
- Bassett, Danielle S; Felix Siebenhühner; Shennan A Weiss; Richard Coppola; Daniel R Weinberger (2013). "Intra- and Inter-Frequency Brain Network Structure in Health and Schizophrenia". PLOS ONE. 8 (8) e72351. Bibcode:2013PLoSO...872351S. doi:10.1371/journal.pone.0072351. PMC 3753323. PMID 23991097.
- Bassett, D. S.; B G Nelson; B A Mueller; J Camchong; K O Lim (2012). "Altered resting state complexity in schizophrenia". NeuroImage. 59 (3): 2196–2207. doi:10.1016/j.neuroimage.2011.10.002. PMC 3254701. PMID 22008374.
- Bassett, D. S.; E. Bullmore (2006). "Small-World Brain Networks". The Neuroscientist. 12 (6): 512–523. CiteSeerX 10.1.1.132.2709. doi:10.1177/1073858406293182. ISSN 1073-8584. PMID 17079517. S2CID 4305469.
- Bassett, D. S.; A. Meyer-Lindenberg; S. Achard; T. Duke; E. Bullmore (2006). "Adaptive reconfiguration of fractal small-world human brain functional networks". Proceedings of the National Academy of Sciences. 103 (51): 19518–19523. Bibcode:2006PNAS..10319518B. doi:10.1073/pnas.0606005103. ISSN 0027-8424. PMC 1838565. PMID 17159150.
- Bassett, D. S.; E. Bullmore; B. A. Verchinski; V. S. Mattay; D. R. Weinberger; A. Meyer-Lindenberg (2008). "Hierarchical Organization of Human Cortical Networks in Health and Schizophrenia". Journal of Neuroscience. 28 (37): 9239–9248. doi:10.1523/JNEUROSCI.1929-08.2008. ISSN 0270-6474. PMC 2878961. PMID 18784304.
