= Alessandro Vespignani =

Italian-American physicist (born 1965)

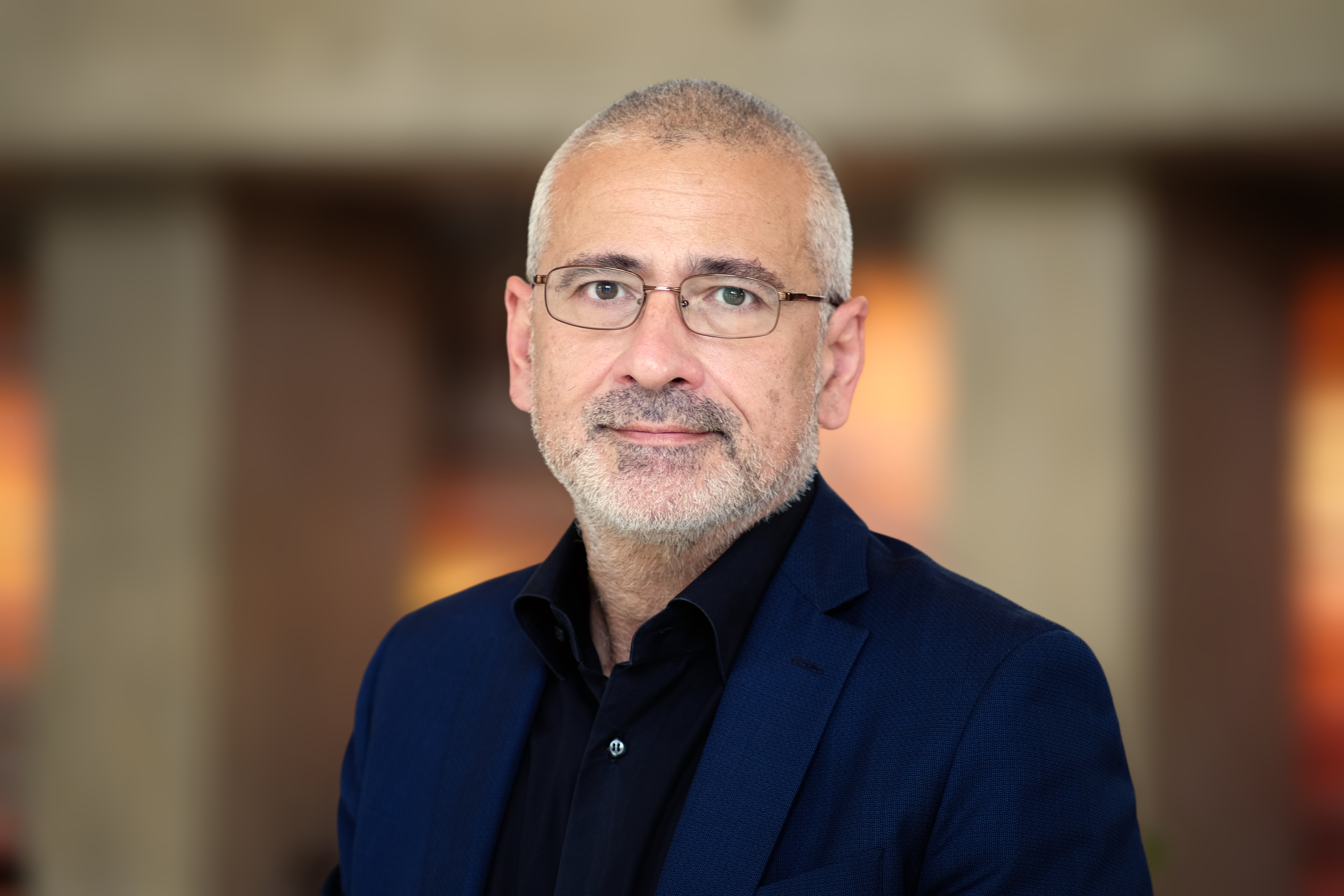
- Born: April 4, 1965 (age 61)
- Education: Sapienza University of Rome
- Known for: network science Mathematical modelling of infectious disease computational epidemiology
- Awards: List of American Physical Society Fellows; Fellows of the Network Science Society; Order of the Star of Italy; Fellow of the American Association for the Advancement of Science
- Scientific career
- Workplaces: Leiden University; International Centre for Theoretical Physics; University of Paris-Sud; Indiana University; Northeastern University

Alessandro Vespignani (born April 4, 1965) is an Italian-American physicist, best known for his work on complex networks, and particularly for work on the applications of network theory to the mathematical modeling of infectious disease, applications of computational epidemiology, and for studies of the topological properties of the Internet. He is currently the Sternberg Family Distinguished University Professor of Physics, Computer Science and Health Sciences at Northeastern University, where he is the director of the Network Science Institute.

Vespignani and his team have contributed mathematical and computational modeling analysis on several disease outbreaks, including 2009 H1N1 flu, Ebola epidemic in West Africa, Zika epidemic, and the COVID-19 pandemic.

Vespignani is author, together with Romualdo Pastor-Satorras, of the book Evolution and Structure of the Internet. Together with Alain Barrat and Marc Barthelemy he has published in 2008 the monograph Dynamical Processes on Complex Networks.

== Career and research ==
Vespignani received his undergraduate degree and Ph.D., both in physics and both from the University of Rome "La Sapienza", in 1990 and 1993, respectively. Following postdoctoral research at Yale University and Leiden University, he worked at the International Centre for Theoretical Physics in Trieste for five years, and briefly at the University of Paris-Sud, before moving to Indiana University in 2004, and then to Northeastern University in 2011.

Vespignani has worked in a number of areas of physics, including characterization of non-equilibrium phenomena and phase transitions, computer science, network science and computational epidemiology. He has collaborated with, among others, Luciano Pietronero, Benoit Mandelbrot, Betz Halloran, Ira Longini, and David Lazer. He describes his current research as being focused on "interdisciplinary application of statistical and numerical simulation methods in the analysis of epidemic and spreading phenomena and the study of biological, social and technological networks."

He is best known, however, for his work on complex networks. Of particular note is his work with Romualdo Pastor-Satorras, in which the two demonstrated that for a disease propagating on a random scale-free network the transmission probability or infectivity necessary to sustain an outbreak tends to zero in the limit of large network size. Vespignani's works on modeling the spatial spread of epidemics includes the realistic and data-driven modeling of emerging infectious diseases, and contributions to computational epidemiology by developing specific tools for the analysis of the global spread of epidemics.

During the COVID-19 pandemic, Vespignani's team investigated how travel and quarantine influenced the dynamics of the spread of SARS-CoV-2. The modeling analysis mapped the early dispersal of infections and the temporal windows of the introduction of SARS-CoV-2 and onset of local transmission in Europe and the US, showing that hidden outbreaks were spreading almost completely undetected in major US cities. Vespignani research contributed also to covid forecasting and scenario analysis.

== Honors ==
Vespignani is an elected fellow of the American Physical Society and the Network Science Society. He has been inducted in the Academia Europaea (section Physics and Engineering) in 2011.

- Aspen Institute Italia Award for scientific research and collaboration between Italy and the United States, 2016
- Doctorate Honoris Causa from Delft University of Technology in the Netherlands, 2017
- John Graunt award for extraordinary achievements in one of the population sciences, 2018
- Senior Scientific award of the Complex Systems Society for outstanding contributions to Complex Systems & Network sciences, 2018
- Premio Nazionale di Divulgazione Scientifica, Associazione Italiana del Libro, 2019
- Euler Award, Network Science Society, 2020
- Knight: Order of the star of Italy,
  9 December 2020
- Elected honorary fellow of the American Association for the Advancement of Science (AAAS), 2022
- The 2025 EPS Statistical and Nonlinear Physics Prize for outstanding research contributions in the area of statistical physics, nonlinear physics, complex systems and complex networks.

== Notable publications ==
- R. Pastor-Satorras & A. Vespignani (2001). "Epidemic spreading in scale-free networks". Physical Review Letters. 86 (14): 3200–3203. arXiv:cond-mat/0010317. Bibcode:2001PhRvL..86.3200P. doi:10.1103/PhysRevLett.86.3200. PMID 11290142. S2CID 16298768.
- R. Pastor-Satorras; A. Vazquez & A. Vespignani (2001). "Dynamical and correlation properties of the Internet". Physical Review Letters. 87 (25) 258701. arXiv:cond-mat/0105161. Bibcode:2001PhRvL..87y8701P. doi:10.1103/PhysRevLett.87.258701. PMID 11736611. S2CID 6232586.
- A. Barrat; M. Barthélemy; R. Pastor-Satorras & A. Vespignani (2004). "The architecture of complex weighted networks". PNAS. 101 (11): 3747–3752. arXiv:cond-mat/0311416. Bibcode:2004PNAS..101.3747B. doi:10.1073/pnas.0400087101. PMC 374315. PMID 15007165.
- Balcan, D.; Colizza, V.; Gonçalves, B.; Hu, H.; Ramasco, J.J.; Vespignani, A. (2009). "Multiscale mobility networks and the spatial spreading of infectious diseases". PNAS. 106 (51): 21484–21489. Bibcode:2009PNAS..10621484B. doi:10.1073/pnas.0906910106. PMC 2793313. PMID 20018697.
- Pastor-Satorras, R.; Vespignani, A. (2004). Evolution and Structure of the Internet. Cambridge University Press. ISBN 0-521-82698-5.
- Barrat, A.; Barthelemy, M.; Vespignani, A. (2008). Dynamical processes on complex networks. Cambridge University Press. ISBN 978-0-521-87950-7.
- Tizzoni, M., Bajardi, P., Poletto, C., Ramasco, J.J., Balcan, D., Goncalves, B., Perra, N., Colizza, V., Vespignani, A., Real-time numerical forecast of global epidemic spreading: case study of 2009 A/H1N1pdm. BMC Med 10, 165 (2012). https://doi.org/10.1186/1741-7015-10-165.
- Merler, Stefano; Ajelli, Marco; Fumanelli, Laura; Gomes, Marcelo F C; Piontti, Ana Pastore y; Rossi, Luca; Chao, Dennis L; Longini, Ira M; Halloran, M Elizabeth; Vespignani, Alessandro (2015). "Spatiotemporal spread of the 2014 outbreak of Ebola virus disease in Liberia and the effectiveness of non-pharmaceutical interventions: a computational modelling analysis". The Lancet Infectious Diseases. 15 (2): 204–211. doi:10.1016/s1473-3099(14)71074-6. ISSN 1473-3099. PMC 4409131. PMID 25575618.
- Zhang, Qian; Sun, Kaiyuan; Chinazzi, Matteo; Pastore y Piontti, Ana; Dean, Natalie E.; Rojas, Diana Patricia; Merler, Stefano; Mistry, Dina; Poletti, Piero; Rossi, Luca; Bray, Margaret; Halloran, M. Elizabeth; Longini, Ira M.; Vespignani, Alessandro (2017-04-25). "Spread of Zika virus in the Americas". Proceedings of the National Academy of Sciences of the United States of America. 114 (22): E4334–E4343. Bibcode:2017PNAS..114E4334Z. doi:10.1073/pnas.1620161114. ISSN 0027-8424. PMC 5465916. PMID 28442561.
- Piontti, A. P., Perra, N., Rossi, L., Samay, N., & Vespignani, A. (2019). Charting the next pandemic: modeling infectious disease spreading in the data science age. Heidelberg: Springer.
