= Delorme =

Delorme may refer to:

- DeLorme, a vendor of mapping and GPS products
- Delorme, West Virginia, an unincorporated community in the United States
- Delorme Formation, a geologic formation in Northwest Territories, Canada
- Delorme operation, a treatment of rectal prolapse
- Delorme 1, binary star named after astronomer Philippe Delorme

== People ==
- Adrien Delorme (Adrien Faizelot-Delorme) (master in 1748 – after 1783), well-known cabinetmaker (ébéniste) working in Paris, the most prominent in a family of ébénistes
- Andre Delorme, (1890-1917), French World War I flying ace
- Arnaud Delorme, born 1974, French university professor (neuroscience)
- Danièle Delorme, (1926–2015), French actress and film producer
- Demesvar Delorme (1831–1901), Haitian theoretician, writer, and politician
- Émilie Delorme, born 1975, appointed as first woman director of the Conservatoire de Paris in December 2019
- Gaye Delorme (Gaye James Delorme) (1947–2011), Canadian songwriter, composer and guitar player
- Gilbert Delorme, born 1962, Canadian professional ice hockey player
- Guillaume Delorme, born 1978, French actor
- Guy Delorme (1929–2005), French actor
- Hugues Delorme (1868–1942), French poet, comedian, playwright and journalist
- Hyacinthe-Marie Simon dit Delorme (1777-1814) was a seigneur and political figure in Lower Canada.
- Isabelle Delorme (1900–1991), Canadian composer, pianist, and music educator
- Karl Delorme (1920-2011), German politician
- Louis Delorme (1824-1895), Quebec lawyer and political figure
- Marc Delorme, born 1970, Canadian professional ice hockey player
- Marguerite Delorme (Marguerite-Anne-Rose Delorme) (1876-1946), French painter
- Marion Delorme (1613–1650), French courtesan
- Maurice Paul Delorme (1919-2012), French prelate of the Roman Catholic Church
- Philippe Delorme, born 1960, French historian and journalist
- Pierre Claude François Delorme (1783–1859), French painter and printmaker
- Pierre Delorme (Pierre de L'Orme) (1832-1912), Canadian Métis fur trader, businessman, farmer and political figure
- Rafael Delorme (Rafael Delorme Salto) (1867-1897), Spanish writer, journalist, and freethinker
- Roland Delorme, (Roland Camille Roger Delorme), born 1983, Canadian mixed martial artist
- Ron Delorme (Ronald Elmer "Chief" Delorme), born 1955, Canadian professional ice hockey player
- Wendy Delorme, born 1979, French actress, writer and performance artist

== See also ==
- Jacques Raige-Delorme (1795-1887), French physician and librarian
- Philibert de l'Orme, French Renaissance architect, sometimes spelled "Delorme"
