= J. A. Scott Kelso =

Northern Irish scientist (born 1947)

J. A. Scott Kelso (born 1947 in Derry, Northern Ireland) is an American neuroscientist, and Professor of Complex Systems and Brain Sciences, Professor of Psychology, Biological Sciences and Biomedical Science at Florida Atlantic University (FAU) in Boca Raton, Florida and The University of Ulster (Magee Campus) in Derry, N. Ireland.

Kelso has worked on coordination dynamics, the science of coordination and on fundamental mechanisms underlying voluntary movements and their relation to the large-scale coordination dynamics of the human brain.

His experimental research in the late 1970s and early 1980s led to the HKB model (Haken–Kelso–Bunz), a mathematical formulation that quantitatively describes and predicts how elementary forms of coordinated behavior arise and change adaptively as a result of nonlinear interactions among components.

== Biography ==
Kelso was born in the city of Derry, Northern Ireland. He attended Foyle College (1958–1965), receiving his undergraduate education at Stranmillis University College Belfast from 1965 to 1969, and the University of Calgary, Alberta from 1971 to 1972. He obtained his PhD from the University of Wisconsin, Madison in 1975.

From 1976 to 1978 Kelso was assistant professor and director of The Motor Behavior Laboratory at the University of Iowa. Between 1978 and 1985 he was senior research scientist at Yale University's Haskins Laboratories in New Haven, Connecticut and Professor of Psychology and Biobehavioral Sciences (Unit of Behavioral Genetics) at the University of Connecticut.

In 1985 he founded the Center for Complex Systems and Brain Sciences at Florida Atlantic University, an interdisciplinary research center that includes neuroscientists, applied mathematicians, physicists, psychologists and computer scientists housed in the same physical facility, working together on common problems of complex, biological systems ranging from molecules to minds. Kelso leads a team of researchers in the Center's Human Brain and Behavior Laboratory.

Since 1985, Kelso has held the Glenwood and Martha Creech Eminent Scholar Chair in Science at Florida Atlantic University, where he is also Professor of Psychology, Biological Sciences, and Biomedical Sciences. Kelso was Program Director of the NIMH’s National Training Program in Complex Systems and Brain Sciences at Florida Atlantic University between 1987 and 2005. Working with the FAU Administration and the Chancellor's office of the State University System, Kelso helped establish the Center's PhD Degree in Complex Systems and Brain Sciences.

In 1995, Kelso co-directed the Summer School in Complex Systems at the Santa Fe Institute. He served as President of the South Florida chapter of Sigma Xi, the Scientific Research Society, from 1995 to 1999. He is a Member of the Scientific Board of the Plexus Institute, the World Council of the Einstein Institutes and the Advisory Board of the Intelligent Systems Research Center at the University of Ulster Magee Campus.

Kelso has held visiting professorships in France, Germany, Russia and (currently) Ireland. He has also lectured extensively in the U.S.A. and abroad. He has received many honors and awards for his scientific research. In 2007, he was named Pierre de Fermat Laureate. In 2017 he was admitted as a member of the Royal Irish Academy.

== Work ==
The objective of Kelso's research is to understand how human beings (and human brains — singly and together) coordinate behavior. Kelso and his research team currently use non-invasive neuroimaging techniques (EEG, MEG, fMRI, PET, etc.) and statistical tools to gather information about the structure and function of the brain during real-time behavior.

Over the last 30 years or so, along with colleagues working in laboratories around the world, he has participated in an interdisciplinary science called coordination dynamics. Coordination dynamics is an empirical and conceptual framework that tries to explain how patterns of coordination form, persist, adapt and change. The insights of coordination dynamics have been applied to predict behavior in different kinds of systems at different levels of analysis.

Coordination dynamics is grounded in the concepts of synergetics and the mathematical tools of dynamical systems (see nonlinear dynamic systems theory and synergetics). But coordination dynamics seeks to model specific properties of human cognition, neurophysiology, and social function – such as anticipation, intention, attention, decision-making and learning. The principal claim of coordination dynamics is that the coordination of neurons in the brain and the coordinated actions of people and animals are linked by virtue of sharing a common mathematical or dynamical structure.

Kelso has worked on metastability in neuroscience. This concept has seen a growing interest among theoretical and computational neuroscientists, since it provides a mathematical formalization for the idea that the individual parts of the brain can on the one hand be specialized and segregated yet on the other hand function as an integrated whole.

=== Early work ===
Kelso's early work used nerve block techniques to cut off sensory input from the limbs in humans. His experiments showed that even without conscious awareness of limb position, humans could move accurately to desired locations in space. Along with work conducted by Polit and Bizzi on monkeys at MIT Kelso's research was a key to helping establish the equilibrium point theory of motor control originally postulated by Anatol Feldman. Then, working with his students David Goodman and Dan Southard he demonstrated—using a pulsed light emitting diode technique long before the age of sophisticated computer assisted motion analysis—that the brain controls the complex, coordinated movements of the upper limbs by exploiting functional synergies, a notion originally put forth by the Russian physiologist and cybernetician Nicolai Bernstein. Further work at Haskins Labs using a combination of novel perturbation techniques, kinematic and intramuscular recordings discovered that the control and coordination of complex speech gestures was also based on functional synergies or coordination structures. In asking how synergies might be formed in motor systems Kelso turned from Sherringtonian neurophysiology to theories of self-organization in particular the fledgling interdisciplinary field of synergetics founded by Hermann Haken. At that time, the dominant understanding of animated movement was that behavior is determined by a "central program", a prearranged set of instructions that prescribe how a set of biomechanical components should behave. In contrast, Kelso showed experimentally that behavior can also emerge in a self-organizing way, as a result of highly nonlinear interactions among many interconnected elements. His experiments were the first to demonstrate the existence of phase transitions—sudden and spontaneous shifts from one coordinated state to another as a parameter is continuously varied. Phase transitions are a basic mechanism of self-organization in nature and Kelso's experiments, which have been replicated many times, were the first to show them in the coordinated movements of human beings.

=== HKB model ===
Kelso and his colleagues later demonstrated that many of the complexities of coordinated motor behavior in complex, multi-degree-of-freedom systems can be derived from relatively simple, but nonlinear mathematical laws. For a review of this work see Kelso et al. (1987) and Schöner and Kelso (1988) In particular, Kelso developed a mathematical model in collaboration with the eminent theoretical physicist Hermann Haken, the father of laser theory and synergetics. This "HKB model" was able to derive basic forms of coordination observed in Kelso's experiments using a system of nonlinear relations between individual coordinating elements The HKB model explained and predicted experimental observations such as "critical slowing down", and "enhanced fluctuations" associated with instability and dramatic changes in coordination. Later extensions of HKB accommodated the effects of noise, broken symmetry, multiple interacting heterogeneous components, recruitment-annihilation processes, parametric stabilization, and the role of changing environments on coordination

=== Brain imaging work ===
Subsequently, Kelso and his colleagues moved from the hand to the brain, using large arrays of SQUID magnetometers to record the neuromagnetic activity of the brain and Functional Magnetic Resonance Imaging to record BOLD (Blood Oxygen Level Dependent) activation in brain regions. This work showed that mathematical forms observable in the coordinated movement of the hands (such as phase transitions), were also observable in images of brain activity. Or as Kelso puts it, "the same coordination dynamics governs brain activity and human behavior." For example, on the basis of recordings and analysis of human brain activity Viktor Jirsa and Armin Fuchs along with Kelso were able to derive the HKB equations of coordination at the behavioral level from a more realistic anatomical and physiological model of the underlying neural substrate

=== Current research ===
Kelso's current work focuses on whether the same principles and mechanisms of coordination dynamics apply also to human brains working together in social settings. Using large electrode arrays now available in the field of electroencephalography (EEG), he and his co-workers have been imaging the brains of pairs of humans, as they perform coordinated hand movements. Remarkably, Kelso's team has identified signatures in the brain that correspond to whether humans coordinate together or act independently. In another line of research, Kelso and colleagues have created a novel way to understand the real time interaction between a human and a machine, called Virtual Partner Interaction (VPI). In VPI, humans coordinate with a virtual partner whose behavior is driven by a computerized version of the HKB equations, known to govern basic forms of human coordination. VPI is a principled approach to human-machine interaction and may open up new ways to understand how humans interact with human-like machines.

=== Books ===
Kelso's first full-length book, Dynamic Patterns : The Self-Organization of Brain and Behavior (MIT Press, 1995) summarizes the first 20 years of his theoretical and experimental work on coordination, and argues that the creation and evolution of patterned behavior at all levels—from neurons to mind—is governed by the dynamical processes of self-organization. The book is written for the general reader, and uses simple experimental examples and illustrations to convey essential concepts, strategies, and methods, with a minimum of mathematics.

With Viktor Jirsa, Kelso edited the book Coordination Dynamics: Issues and Trends (Springer, 2004). Kelso is also the founding editor for the Springer series on "Understanding Complex Systems" and has served on the Editorial Boards of 10 scientific journals/periodicals in various disciplines.

Kelso's second full-length book, written with his former postdoc David A. Engstrøm, is The Complementary Nature (MIT Press, 2006). This book attempts to reconcile what it calls "the philosophy of complementary pairs" with the science of coordination dynamics. Pairs of opposites are found everywhere in nature and in science (e.g. cooperation and competition, integration and segregation, individual and collective, self and other, body and mind, nature and nurture, etc. etc.). Kelso and Engstrøm argue that these pairs are not mutually exclusive, but complementary. They propose a comprehensive, empirically-based scientific theory of how contraries can be reconciled based on Kelso's theory of metastable coordination dynamics. The essence of the theory is that the human brain is capable of displaying two apparently contradictory, mutually exclusive behaviors – integration and segregation – at the same time. Kelso and Engstrøm use the tilde, or squiggle (~), as the symbol for reconciled complementary pairs (e.g. body~mind, nature~nurture). The squiggle exposes a basic truth: both complementary aspects and their dynamics are needed for an exhaustive description and understanding of the complex phenomena and systems in life, mind, society and nature.

== Publications ==
Scott Kelso has published numerous articles and books. A selection:

- 1973. The nerve compression block as a determiner of behavioral and neurological parameters
- 1982. Human motor behavior: an introduction.
- 1982. The Development of movement control and coordination, with Jane E. Clark.
- 1995. Dynamic patterns: the self-organization of brain and behavior
- 2004. Coordination dynamics: issues and trends, with Viktor K. Jirsa
- 2006. The complementary nature, with David A. Engstrøm
