= Complex =

Complex commonly refers to:

- Complexity, the behaviour of a system whose components interact in multiple ways so possible interactions are difficult to describe
  - Complex system, a system composed of many components which may interact with each other
- Complex (psychology), a core pattern of emotions etc. in the personal unconscious organized around a common theme such as power or status

Complex may also refer to:

== Arts, entertainment and media ==
- Complex (English band), formed in 1968, and their 1971 album Complex
- Complex (band), a Japanese rock band
- Complex (album), by Montaigne, 2019, and its title track
- Complex (EP), by Rifle Sport, 1985
- "Complex" (song), by Gary Numan, 1979
- "Complex", a song by Katie Gregson-MacLeod, 2022
- "Complex" a song by Be'O and Zico, 2022
- Complex Networks, publisher of the now-only-online magazine Complex

== Biology ==
- Protein–ligand complex, a complex of a protein bound with a ligand
- Exosome complex, a multi-protein intracellular complex
- Protein complex, a group of two or more associated polypeptide chains
- Species complex, a cluster of very similar species difficult to delimit
- Pre-Bötzinger complex, a cluster of interneurons in the ventral respiratory group of the medulla of the brainstem

== Chemistry ==
- Coordination complex, a central atom or ion and a surrounding array of bound molecules or ions
- Chelate complex, a coordination complex with more than one bond

== Mathematics ==
- Complex number, an extension of real numbers obtained by adjoining imaginary numbers
- Complex, an element of a field of sets
- Chain complex, an algebraic structure
- Simplicial complex, a kind of topological space
- CW complex, a kind of topological space
- Line complex, a 3-dimensional family of lines in space
- Complex analysis, mathematical analysis of functions of variables which can be complex numbers

== Geology ==
- Complex (geology), a unit of rocks composed of rocks of two or three types
- Complex crater, a type of large impact crater morphology
- Volcanic complex, a group of volcanoes
- Complex volcano, a volcano of mixed form
- Accretionary complex, a fossil accretionary wedge

== Other uses ==
- Building complex, a group of inter-related buildings
  - Housing complex, specifically residential
  - Market complex, group of stores or business firms in a marketplace having common walkway(s), usually enclosed within a boundary or situated under one roof
- UCL Centre for Mathematics and Physics in the Life Sciences and Experimental Biology (CoMPLEX), part of UCL Faculty of Mathematical and Physical Sciences, London, UK

== See also ==
- Complexity (disambiguation)
- Complexity theory (disambiguation)
- Military–industrial complex
