= Fractal physiology =

Type of physiology

Fractal physiology refers to the study of physiological systems using complexity science methods, such as chaos measure, entropy, and fractal dimensions. The underlying assumption is that biological systems are complex and exhibit non-linear patterns of activity, and that characterizing that complexity (using dedicated mathematical approaches) is useful to understand, and make inferences and predictions about the system.

== Main Findings ==
=== Neurophysiology ===
Quantifications of the complexity of brain activity is used in the context of neuropsychiatric diseases and mental states characterization, such as schizophrenia, affective disorders, or neurodegenerative disorders. Particularly, diminished EEG complexity is typically associated with increased symptomatology.

=== Cardiovascular systems ===
The complexity of Heart Rate Variability is a useful predictor of cardiovascular health.

== Software ==
In Python, NeuroKit provides a comprehensive set of functions for complexity analysis of physiological data. AntroPy implements several measures to quantify the complexity of time-series.

In R, TSEntropies provides methods to quantify the entropy. casnet implements a collection of analytic tools for studying signals recorded from complex adaptive systems.

In MATLAB, The Neurophysiological Biomarker Toolbox (NBT) allows the computation of Detrended fluctuation analysis. EZ Entropy implements the entropy analysis of physiological time-series.

== See also ==
- Fractal dimension
- Entropy
- Complex system
