= Complex system =

System composed of many interacting components

A complex system is a system composed of many components that interact with one another. This definition, though, would describe any system. For a system to be complex, most definitions require that the result of interactions are likely to be non-linear or asymmetrical—where small changes can lead to very large system change or large changes lead to little or no change in the system. Examples of complex systems are Earth's global climate, organisms, the human brain, infrastructure such as a power grid, transportation or communication systems, complex software and electronic systems, social and economic organizations (like cities), an ecosystem, a living cell, and, ultimately, for some authors, the entire universe.

The behavior of a complex system is intrinsically difficult to model due to the dependencies, competitions, relationships, and other types of interactions between their parts or between a given system and its environment. Systems that are "complex" have distinct properties that arise from these relationships, such as nonlinearity, emergence, spontaneous order, adaptation, and feedback loops, among others. Because such systems appear in a wide variety of fields, the commonalities among them have become the topic of their independent area of research. In many cases, it is useful to represent such a system as a network (graph) where the nodes represent the components and links represent their interactions.

The term complex systems often refers to the study of complex systems, which is an approach to science that investigates how relationships between a system's parts give rise to its collective behaviors and how the system interacts and forms relationships with its environment. The study of complex systems regards collective, or system-wide, behaviors as the fundamental object of study; for this reason, complex systems can be understood as an alternative paradigm to reductionism, which attempts to explain systems in terms of their constituent parts and the individual interactions between them.

As an interdisciplinary domain, complex systems draw contributions from many different fields, such as the study of self-organization and critical phenomena from physics, of spontaneous order from the social sciences, chaos from mathematics, adaptation from biology, and many others. Complex systems is therefore often used as a broad term encompassing a research approach to problems in many diverse disciplines, including statistical physics, information theory, nonlinear dynamics, anthropology, computer science, meteorology, sociology, economics, psychology, biology and polyplocology.

== Types of systems ==
Complex systems can be:

- Complex adaptive systems which have the capacity to change,
- Polycentric systems "where many elements are capable of making mutual adjustments for ordering their relationships with one another within a general system of rules where each element acts with independence of other elements",
- Disorganised systems which involve localized interactions of multiple entities that do not form a coherent whole. Disorganised systems are linked to self-organisation processes.
- Hierarchical systems which are analyzable into successive sets of subsystems. They can also be called nested or embedded systems.
- Cybernetic systems which involve information feedback loops.

== Key concepts ==
=== Adaptation ===
Complex adaptive systems are special cases of complex systems that are adaptive in that they have the capacity to change and learn from experience. Examples of complex adaptive systems include the international trade markets, social insect and ant colonies, the biosphere and the ecosystem, the brain and the immune system, the cell and the developing embryo, cities, manufacturing businesses and any human social group-based endeavor in a cultural and social system such as political parties or communities.

=== Decomposability ===
A system is decomposable if the parts of the system (subsystems) are independent from each other, for example the model of a perfect gas considers the relations among molecules negligible. A great deal of system thinking, especially in social systems, assumes decomposability. Yet a truly decomposable system is not a complex system.

In a nearly decomposable system, the interactions between subsystems are weak but not negligible; this is often the case in social systems. Conceptually, a system is nearly decomposable if the variables composing it can be separated into classes and subclasses, if these variables are independent for many functions but affect each other, and if the whole system is greater than the parts.

== Features ==
Complex systems may have the following features:

Complex systems may be open
Complex systems are usually open systems – that is, they exist in a thermodynamic gradient and dissipate energy. In other words, complex systems are frequently far from energetic equilibrium: but despite this flux, there may be pattern stability, see synergetics.

Complex systems may exhibit critical transitions

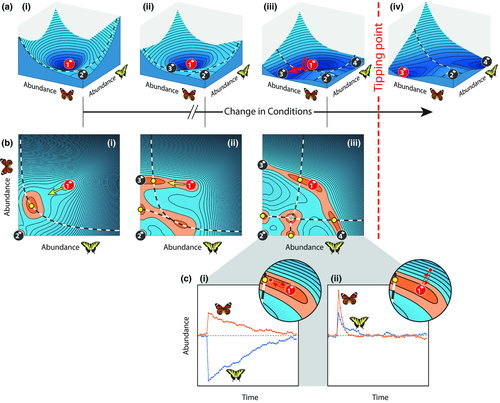
Graphical representation of alternative stable states and the direction of critical slowing down prior to a critical transition (taken from Lever et al. 2020). Top panels (a) indicate stability landscapes at different conditions. Middle panels (b) indicate the rates of change akin to the slope of the stability landscapes, and bottom panels (c) indicate a recovery from a perturbation towards the system's future state (c.I) and in another direction (c.II).

Critical transitions are abrupt shifts in the state of ecosystems, the climate, financial and economic systems or other complex systems that may occur when changing conditions pass a critical or bifurcation point. The 'direction of critical slowing down' in a system's state space may be indicative of a system's future state after such transitions when delayed negative feedbacks leading to oscillatory or other complex dynamics are weak.

Complex systems may be nested
The components of a complex system may themselves be complex systems. For example, an economy is made up of organisations, which are made up of people, which are made up of cells – all of which are complex systems. The arrangement of interactions within complex bipartite networks may be nested as well. More specifically, bipartite ecological and organisational networks of mutually beneficial interactions were found to have a nested structure. This structure promotes indirect facilitation and a system's capacity to persist under increasingly harsh circumstances as well as the potential for large-scale systemic regime shifts.

Dynamic network of multiplicity
As well as coupling rules, the dynamic network of a complex system is important. Small-world or scale-free networks which have many local interactions and a smaller number of inter-area connections are often employed. Natural complex systems often exhibit such topologies. In the human cortex for example, we see dense local connectivity and a few very long axon projections between regions inside the cortex and to other brain regions.

Gosper's Glider Gun creating "gliders" in the cellular automaton Conway's Game of Life

May produce emergent phenomena
Complex systems may exhibit behaviors that are emergent, which is to say that while the results may be sufficiently determined by the activity of the systems' basic constituents, they may have properties that can only be studied at a higher level. For example, empirical food webs display regular, scale-invariant features across aquatic and terrestrial ecosystems when studied at the level of clustered 'trophic' species. Another example is offered by the termites in a mound which have physiology, biochemistry and biological development at one level of analysis, whereas their social behavior and mound building is a property that emerges from the collection of termites and needs to be analyzed at a different level.

Relationships are non-linear
In practical terms, this means a small perturbation may cause a large effect (see butterfly effect), a proportional effect, or even no effect at all. In linear systems, the effect is always directly proportional to cause. See nonlinearity.

Relationships contain feedback loops
Both negative (damping) and positive (amplifying) feedback are always found in complex systems. The effects of an element's behavior are fed back in such a way that the element itself is altered.

== History ==
In 1948, Dr. Warren Weaver published an essay on "Science and Complexity", exploring the diversity of problem types by contrasting problems of simplicity, disorganized complexity, and organized complexity. Weaver described these as "problems which involve dealing simultaneously with a sizable number of factors which are interrelated into an organic whole."

While the explicit study of complex systems dates at least to the 1970s, the first research institute focused on complex systems, the Santa Fe Institute, was founded in 1984. Early Santa Fe Institute participants included physics Nobel laureates Murray Gell-Mann and Philip Anderson, economics Nobel laureate Kenneth Arrow, and Manhattan Project scientists George Cowan and Herb Anderson. Today, there are over 50 institutes and research centers focusing on complex systems.

Since the late 1990s, the interest of mathematical physicists in researching economic phenomena has been on the rise. The proliferation of cross-disciplinary research with the application of solutions originated from the physics epistemology has entailed a gradual paradigm shift in the theoretical articulations and methodological approaches in economics, primarily in financial economics. The development has resulted in the emergence of a new branch of discipline, namely "econophysics", which is broadly defined as a cross-discipline that applies statistical physics methodologies which are mostly based on the complex systems theory and the chaos theory for economics analysis.

The 2021 Nobel Prize in Physics was awarded to Syukuro Manabe, Klaus Hasselmann, and Giorgio Parisi for their work to understand complex systems. Their work was used to create more accurate computer models of the effect of global warming on the Earth's climate.

== Applications ==
=== Complexity in practice ===
The traditional approach to dealing with complexity is to reduce or constrain it. Typically, this involves compartmentalization: dividing a large system into separate parts. Organizations, for instance, divide their work into departments that each deal with separate issues. Engineering systems are often designed using modular components. However, modular designs become susceptible to failure when issues arise that bridge the divisions.

=== Complexity of cities ===
Jane Jacobs described cities as being a problem in organized complexity in 1961, citing Dr. Weaver's 1948 essay. As an example, she explains how an abundance of factors interplay into how various urban spaces lead to a diversity of interactions, and how changing those factors can change how the space is used, and how well the space supports the functions of the city. She further illustrates how cities have been severely damaged when approached as a problem in simplicity by replacing organized complexity with simple and predictable spaces, such as Le Corbusier's "Radiant City" and Ebenezer Howard's "Garden City". Since then, others have written at length on the complexity of cities.

=== Complexity economics ===
Over the last decades, within the emerging field of complexity economics, new predictive tools have been developed to explain economic growth. Such is the case with the models built by the Santa Fe Institute in 1989 and the more recent economic complexity index (ECI), introduced by the MIT physicist Cesar A. Hidalgo and the Harvard economist Ricardo Hausmann.

Recurrence quantification analysis has been employed to detect the characteristic of business cycles and economic development. To this end, Orlando et al. developed the so-called recurrence quantification correlation index (RQCI) to test correlations of RQA on a sample signal and then investigated the application to business time series. The said index has been proven to detect hidden changes in time series. Further, Orlando et al., over an extensive dataset, shown that recurrence quantification analysis may help in anticipating transitions from laminar (i.e. regular) to turbulent (i.e. chaotic) phases such as USA GDP in 1949, 1953, etc. Last but not least, it has been demonstrated that recurrence quantification analysis can detect differences between macroeconomic variables and highlight hidden features of economic dynamics.

=== Complexity and education ===
Focusing on issues of student persistence with their studies, Forsman, Moll and Linder explore the "viability of using complexity science as a frame to extend methodological applications for physics education research", finding that "framing a social network analysis within a complexity science perspective offers a new and powerful applicability across a broad range of PER topics".

=== Complexity in healthcare research and practice ===
Healthcare systems are prime examples of complex systems, characterized by interactions among diverse stakeholders, such as patients, providers, policymakers, and researchers, across various sectors like health, government, community, and education. These systems demonstrate properties like non-linearity, emergence, adaptation, and feedback loops. Complexity science in healthcare frames knowledge translation as a dynamic and interconnected network of processes—problem identification, knowledge creation, synthesis, implementation, and evaluation—rather than a linear or cyclical sequence. Such approaches emphasize the importance of understanding and leveraging the interactions within and between these processes and stakeholders to optimize the creation and movement of knowledge. By acknowledging the complex, adaptive nature of healthcare systems, complexity science advocates for continuous stakeholder engagement, transdisciplinary collaboration, and flexible strategies to effectively translate research into practice.

=== Complexity and biology ===
Complexity science has been applied to living organisms, and in particular to biological systems. Within the emerging field of fractal physiology, bodily signals, such as heart rate or brain activity, are characterized using entropy or fractal indices. The goal is often to assess the state and the health of the underlying system, and diagnose potential disorders and illnesses.

=== Complexity and chaos theory ===
Complex systems theory is related to chaos theory, which in turn has its origins more than a century ago in the work of the French mathematician Henri Poincaré. Chaos is sometimes viewed as extremely complicated information, rather than as an absence of order. Chaotic systems remain deterministic, though their long-term behavior can be difficult to predict with any accuracy. With perfect knowledge of the initial conditions and the relevant equations describing the chaotic system's behavior, one can theoretically make perfectly accurate predictions of the system, though in practice this is impossible to do with arbitrary accuracy.

The emergence of complex systems theory shows a domain between deterministic order and randomness which is complex. This is referred to as the "edge of chaos".

A plot of the Lorenz attractor

When one analyzes complex systems, sensitivity to initial conditions, for example, is not an issue as important as it is within chaos theory, in which it prevails. As stated by Colander, the study of complexity is the opposite of the study of chaos. Complexity is about how a huge number of extremely complicated and dynamic sets of relationships can generate some simple behavioral patterns, whereas chaotic behavior, in the sense of deterministic chaos, is the result of a relatively small number of non-linear interactions. For recent examples in economics and business see Stoop et al. who discussed Android's market position, Orlando who explained the corporate dynamics in terms of mutual synchronization and chaos regularization of bursts in a group of chaotically bursting cells and Orlando et al. who modelled financial data (Financial Stress Index, swap and equity, emerging and developed, corporate and government, short and long maturity) with a low-dimensional deterministic model.

Therefore, the main difference between chaotic systems and complex systems is their history. Chaotic systems do not rely on their history as complex ones do. Chaotic behavior pushes a system in equilibrium into chaotic order, which means, in other words, out of what we traditionally define as 'order'. On the other hand, complex systems evolve far from equilibrium at the edge of chaos. They evolve at a critical state built up by a history of irreversible and unexpected events, which physicist Murray Gell-Mann called "an accumulation of frozen accidents". In a sense chaotic systems can be regarded as a subset of complex systems distinguished precisely by this absence of historical dependence. Many real complex systems are, in practice and over long but finite periods, robust. However, they do possess the potential for radical qualitative change of kind whilst retaining systemic integrity. Metamorphosis serves as perhaps more than a metaphor for such transformations.

=== Complexity and network science ===
A complex system is usually composed of many components and their interactions. Such a system can be represented by a network where nodes represent the components and links represent their interactions. For example, the Internet can be represented as a network composed of nodes (computers) and links (direct connections between computers). Other examples of complex networks include social networks, financial institution interdependencies, airline networks, and biological networks.

== Notable scholars ==
- Lada Adamic
- Robert McCormick Adams
- Christopher Alexander
- Philip Anderson
- Kenneth Arrow
- Robert Axelrod
- W. Brian Arthur
- Per Bak
- Béla H. Bánáthy
- Dani Bassett
- Niklas Luhmann
- Albert-Laszlo Barabasi
- Yaneer Bar-Yam
- Gregory Bateson
- Ludwig von Bertalanffy
- Alexander Bogdanov
- Samuel Bowles
- Guido Caldarelli
- Paul Cilliers
- Walter Clemens, Jr.
- James P. Crutchfield
- Chris Danforth
- Peter Sheridan Dodds
- Raissa D'Souza
- Tina Eliassi-Rad
- Brian Enquist
- Joshua Epstein
- Doyne Farmer
- Jay Forrester
- Nigel R. Franks
- Murray Gell-Mann
- Carlos Gershenson
- Nigel Goldenfeld
- Vittorio Guidano
- Hermann Haken
- James Hartle
- F. A. Hayek
- Dirk Helbing
- John Holland
- Alfred Hubler
- Arthur Iberall
- Stuart Kauffman
- J. A. Scott Kelso
- David Krakauer
- Simon A. Levin
- Ellen Levy
- Wander Lowie
- Robert May
- Donella Meadows
- José Fernando Mendes
- Melanie Mitchell
- Cris Moore
- Yamir Moreno
- Edgar Morin
- Harold Morowitz
- Adilson E. Motter
- Scott Page
- Luciano Pietronero
- David Pines
- Vladimir Pokrovskii
- William T. Powers
- Ilya Prigogine
- Steen Rasmussen
- Sidney Redner
- Robert Rosen
- Jerry Sabloff
- Cosma Shalizi
- Herbert Simon
- Dave Snowden
- Sergei Starostin
- Steven Strogatz
- Stefan Thurner
- Alessandro Vespignani
- Andreas Wagner
- Duncan Watts
- Geoffrey West
- Stephen Wolfram
- David Wolpert
- Douglas Hofstadter
- Tiago P. Peixoto

== See also ==
- Biological organisation
- Chaos theory
- Cognitive modeling
- Cognitive science
- Complex (disambiguation)
- Complex adaptive system
- Complex networks
- Complexity
- Complexity (disambiguation)
- Complexity economics
- Complexity Science Hub Vienna
- Computational Social Science
- Cybernetics
- Decision engineering
- Dissipative system
- Dual-phase evolution
- Dynamical system
- Dynamical systems theory
- Emergence
- Enterprise systems engineering
- Fractal
- Fractal physiology
- Generative sciences
- Hierarchy theory
- Homeokinetics
- Interdependent networks
- Invisible hand
- Mixed reality
- Multi-agent system
- Network science
- Neuroscience and intelligence
- fr:Noogenèse
- Nonlinearity
- Pattern-oriented modeling
- Percolation
- Percolation theory
- Process architecture
- Self-organization
- Social information processing
- Sociology and complexity science
- System accident
- System dynamics
- System equivalence
- Systems engineering
- Systems theory
- Systems theory in anthropology
- Tektology
- Ultra-large-scale systems
- Volatility, uncertainty, complexity and ambiguity
