= Triangular coordinates =

The term triangular coordinates may refer to any of at least three related systems of coordinates in the Euclidean plane:

- a special case of barycentric coordinates for a triangle, in which case it is known as a ternary plot or areal coordinates, among other names
- Trilinear coordinates, in which the coordinates of a point in a triangle are its relative distances from the three sides
- Synergetics coordinates
