= Harold Max Rosenberg =

British physicist (1922–1993)

Harry Rosenberg
- Born: August 26, 1922; East Ham, then Essex, now London, UK
- Died: November 21, 1993 (aged 71); Brazil
- Education: University College London; University of Oxford
- Known for: Solid-state physics Low temperature physics
- Awards: Brazilian Order of Scientific Merit
- Scientific career
- Fields: Physicist
- Workplaces: University of Oxford
- Doctoral advisor: Kurt Mendelssohn
- Doctoral students: Peter V. E. McClintock

Harold Max Rosenberg (26 August 1922 – 21 November 1993), was an English experimental physicist who is notable for two successful textbooks: Low Temperature Solid State Physics (1963) and The Solid State (1975) and over one hundred papers mainly about the electrical, thermal and mechanical properties of solids, especially at low temperatures.

== Early life and education ==
Harry Rosenberg was the son of a small shopkeeper in East Ham, then in Essex, now part of the London Borough of Newham. He left school at 16 and went into the Civil Service in a clerical post. He volunteered and served throughout the war in the RAF working with radio equipment, which he had studied in his spare time. On demobilization he was given a further education, a training grant, and studied at University College London (UCL). He graduated with a first class honours degree in physics from UCL, and then obtained a DPhil in 1953 from the University of Oxford under Kurt Mendelssohn.

== Career ==
Six years later he became a university lecturer and in 1978 was appointed a Reader. He also became a fellow of the newly founded Linacre College, Oxford a graduate college, and subsequently, in 1970, a tutorial fellow of St Catherine's College, Oxford.

Harry Rosenberg's initial research was in the area of metals, but in 1962 new phenomena associated with magnetism and the interaction between magnetism and phonons (the quantized vibrations that store and transport heat in insulating as well as metallic solids) began to interest him. This occupied his attention for the next decade. Then, in 1972, he began the work on composite, disordered and amorphous materials that lasted until his retirement.

On his 60th birthday, in 1982, Rosenberg was gloomily contemplating the need to find a new topic of research to last until his retirement, when a note from an old colleague, Ray Orbach in California, showed that his experimental results on the low temperature properties of amorphous solids found a natural explanation in terms of the newly discovered mathematical theory of fractals, by now of course familiar through the strange and beautiful pictures that they generate.

This new approach to the interpretation of excitations in disordered solids was first expressed in the paper "Fractal interpretation of vibrational properties of cross-linked polymers, glasses and irradiated quartz," which, according to Orbach, was a very controversial piece of work, greeted with considerable skepticism.

Rosenberg was regarded as a gifted lecturer, not only to undergraduates and to colleagues at conferences, but also to a much wider audience, both on the radio and on television.

== Death ==
He died on 21 November 1993, whilst on holiday in Brazil, survived by his wife Mildred Anna and three daughters.

== Honors ==
He was a member of the Brazilian Academy of Sciences and received the Brazilian Order of Scientific Merit.

== Books by Rosenberg ==
- Harold Max Rosenberg, The Solid-State, Oxford University Press (1975), ISBN 0-19-851832-3
- Harold Max Rosenberg, Low Temperature Solid State Physics, Oxford University Press (1963), ISBN 0-19-851910-9
