= Quadray coordinates =

Coordinate system

Quadray coordinates, also known as caltrop, tetray or Chakovian coordinates (named for David Chako), were developed by Darrel Jarmusch (in 1981) and others, as another take on simplicial coordinates, a coordinate system using a simplex or tetrahedron as its basis polyhedron.

== Geometric definition ==
The four basis (but not necessarily unit) vectors stem from the center of a regular tetrahedron and go to its four corners. Their coordinate addresses are (1, 0, 0, 0), (0, 1, 0, 0), (0, 0, 1, 0) and (0, 0, 0, 1) respectively. These may be positively scaled without rotation (e.g. negation) and linearly combined to span conventional XYZ space, with at least one of the four coordinates unneeded (set to zero).

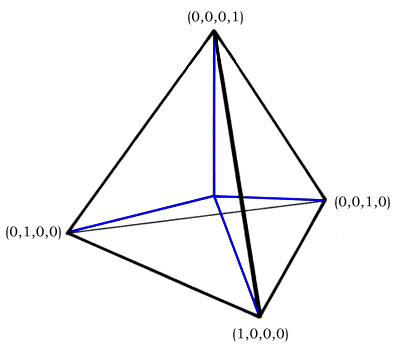
Four basis quadrays to the corners of a regular tetrahedron

== Pedagogical significance ==
A typical application might set the edges of the basis tetrahedron as unit. The tetrahedron itself may also be defined as the unit of volume (see below).

The four quadrays may be linearly combined to provide integer coordinates for the inverse tetrahedron (0,1,1,1), (1,0,1,1), (1,1,0,1), (1,1,1,0), and for the cube, octahedron, rhombic dodecahedron and cuboctahedron of volumes 3, 4, 6 and 20 respectively, given the starting tetrahedron of unit volume.

For example, given A, B, C, D as (1,0,0,0), (0,1,0,0), (0,0,1,0) and (0,0,0,1) respectively, the vertices of an octahedron with the same edge length and volume four would be A + B, A + C, A + D, B + C, B + D, C + D or all eight permutations of {1,1,0,0}.

The 12 permutations of {2,1,1,0} define the vertices of the volume 20 cuboctahedron centered at (0,0,0,0). These vectors point from any given sphere to its 12 surrounding neighbors in the cubic close packing (CCP), equivalently the IVM (isotropic vector matrix) in Synergetics. Therefore, CCP ball centers all have non-negative integer coordinates.

Shape	Volume	Vertex Inventory (sum of Quadrays)
Tetrahedron	1	A,B,C,D
Inverse Tetrahedron	1	E,F,G,H = B+C+D, A+C+D, A+B+D, A+B+C
Duo-Tet Cube	3	A through H
Octahedron	4	I,J,K,L,M,N = A+B, A+C, A+D, B+C, B+D, C+D
Rhombic Dodecahedron	6	A through N
Cuboctahedron	20	O,P,Q,R,S,T = I+J, I+K, I+L, I+M, N+J, N+K; U,V,W,X,Y,Z = N+L, N+M, J+L, L+M, M+K, K+J

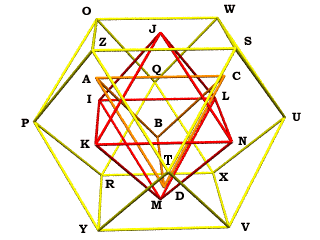

dual tetrahedron labels E,F,G,H omitted to reduce clutter

If one now calls this volume "4D" as in "four-dimensional" or "four-directional" we have primed the pump for an understanding of R. Buckminster Fuller's "4D geometry," or Synergetics.

In this American transcendentalist philosophy, the regular tetrahedron whose six edges are all of unit length one — each edge being the center-to-center distance between two of four inter-tangent, equal-radius balls — is taken as the unit of volume.

A set of familiar convex polyhedra, termed "the concentric hierarchy" is nested around it, per the above table, such that the cube has volume 3, the octahedron volume 4, rhombic dodecahedron volume 6, and cuboctahedron volume 20.

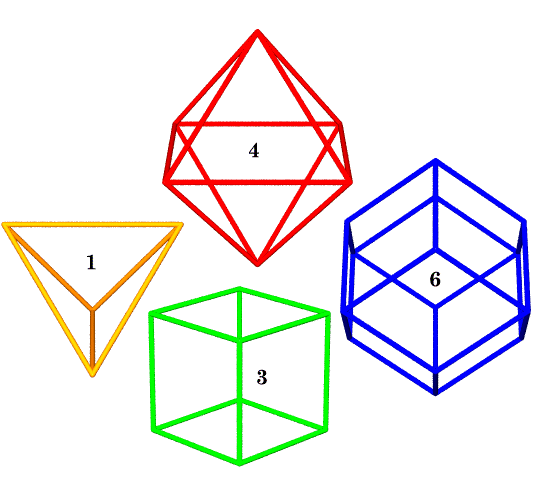
Whole Number Volumes

== Conversion to Cartesian coordinates ==
To convert a quadray address $(a, b, c, d)$ to conventional XYZ coordinates, one normalizes so the four values sum to zero — subtracting their mean $\tfrac{1}{4}(a + b + c + d)$ from each — and treats the resulting zero-sum 4-tuple as a four-dimensional vector projected into 3-space. Because the all-ones quadray $(1, 1, 1, 1)$ maps to the origin, adding a constant to all four coordinates leaves the Cartesian point fixed, matching the convention that one of the four coordinates may always be reduced to zero.

This normalization is optional. Enforcing the zero-sum constraint $a + b + c + d = 0$ reduces the four coordinates to three degrees of freedom, isomorphic to Cartesian XYZ space; relaxing it instead retains all four coordinates as independent parameters, so the same tetrahedral basis addresses a four-degree-of-freedom space that contains the ordinary 3-space as its zero-sum subspace. The normalized and relaxed forms describe the same point set but differ in how many coordinates are treated as free.

Choosing the four basis quadrays to lie at alternate corners of a cube of edge 2 (so that the basis tetrahedron has edge $2\sqrt{2}$) yields the embedding

$$\mathbf{A} \to (1, 1, 1),\quad \mathbf{B} \to (-1, -1, 1),\quad \mathbf{C} \to (-1, 1, -1),\quad \mathbf{D} \to (1, -1, -1),$$

so that

$$\begin{pmatrix} x \\ y \\ z \end{pmatrix} = \begin{pmatrix} 1 & -1 & -1 & 1 \\ 1 & -1 & 1 & -1 \\ 1 & 1 & -1 & -1 \end{pmatrix} \begin{pmatrix} a \\ b \\ c \\ d \end{pmatrix}.$$

For instance, the octahedron vertex $\mathbf{A} + \mathbf{B} = (1, 1, 0, 0)$ maps to $(0, 0, 2)$; the six permutations of $\{1, 1, 0, 0\}$ give an octahedron of edge $2\sqrt{2}$, equal to that of the basis tetrahedron.

== See also ==
- Barycentric coordinates (mathematics)
- Caltrop
- Synergetics
- Synergetics coordinates
- Tetrahedron
- Trilinear coordinates
