= Metastability in the brain =

In the field of computational neuroscience, the theory of metastability refers to the human brain's ability to integrate several functional parts and to produce neural oscillations in a cooperative and coordinated manner, providing the basis for conscious activity.

Metastability, a state in which signals (such as oscillatory waves) fall outside their natural equilibrium state but persist for an extended period of time, is a principle that describes the brain's ability to make sense out of seemingly random environmental cues. In the past 25 years, interest in metastability and the underlying framework of nonlinear dynamics has been fueled by advancements in the methods by which computers model brain activity.

== Overview ==
EEG measures the gross electrical activity of the brain that can be observed on the surface of the skull. In the metastability theory, EEG outputs produce oscillations that can be described as having identifiable patterns that correlate with each other at certain frequencies. Each neuron in a neuronal network normally outputs a dynamical oscillatory waveform, but also has the ability to output a chaotic waveform. When neurons are integrated into the neural network by interfacing neurons with each other, the dynamical oscillations created by each neuron can be combined to form highly predictable EEG oscillations.

By identifying these correlations and the individual neurons that contribute to predictable EEG oscillations, scientists can determine which cortical domains are processing in parallel and which neuronal networks are intertwined. In many cases, metastability describes instances in which distal parts of the brain interact with each other to respond to environmental stimuli.

== Frequency domains of metastability ==
It has been suggested that one integral facet of brain dynamics underlying conscious thought is the brain's ability to convert seemingly noisy or chaotic signals into predictable oscillatory patterns.

In EEG oscillations of neural networks, neighboring waveform frequencies are correlated on a logarithmic scale rather than a linear scale. As a result, mean frequencies in oscillatory bands cannot link together according to linearity of their mean frequencies. Instead, phase transitions are linked according to their ability to couple with adjacent phase shifts in a constant state of transition between unstable and stable phase synchronization. This phase synchronization forms the basis of metastable behavior in neural networks.

Metastable behavior occurs at the high frequency domain known as 1/f regime. This regime describes an environment in which a noisy signal (also known as pink noise) has been induced, where the amount of power the signal outputs over a certain bandwidth (its power spectral density) is inversely proportional to its frequency.

Noise at the 1/f regime can be found in many biological systems – for instance, in the output of a heartbeat in an ECG waveform—but serves a unique purpose for phase synchrony in neuronal networks At the 1/f regime, the brain is in the critical state necessary for a conscious response to weak or chaotic environmental signals because it can shift the random signals into identifiable and predictable oscillatory waveforms. While often transient, these waveforms exist in a stable form long enough to contribute to what can be thought of as a conscious response to environmental stimuli.

== Theories of metastability ==
=== Oscillatory activity and coordination dynamics ===
The dynamical system model, which represents networks composed of integrated neural systems communicating with one another between unstable and stable phases, has become an increasingly popular theory underpinning the understanding of metastability. Coordination dynamics forms the basis for this dynamical system model by describing mathematical formulae and paradigms governing the coupling of environmental stimuli to their effectors.

==== History of coordination dynamics and the Haken-Kelso-Bunz (HKB) model ====
The so-named HKB model is one of the earliest and well-respected theories to describe coordination dynamics in the brain. In this model, the formation of neural networks can be partly described as self-organization, where individual neurons and small neuronal systems aggregate and coordinate to either adapt or respond to local stimuli or to divide labor and specialize in function.

Transition of parallel movement of index fingers to antiparallel, symmetric movement

In the last 20 years, the HKB model has become a widely accepted theory to explain the coordinated movements and behaviors of individual neurons into large, end-to-end neural networks. Originally the model described a system in which spontaneous transitions observed in finger movements could be described as a series of in-phase and out-of-phase movements.

In the mid-1980s HKB model experiments, subjects were asked to wave one finger on each hand in two modes of direction: first, known as out of phase, both fingers moving in the same direction back and forth (as windshield wipers might move); and second, known as in-phase, where both fingers come together and move away to and from the midline of the body. To illustrate coordination dynamics, the subjects were asked to move their fingers out of phase with increasing speed until their fingers were moving as fast as possible. As movement approached its critical speed, the subjects’ fingers were found to move from out-of-phase (windshield-wiper-like) movement to in-phase (toward midline movement).

The HKB model is a method to describe seemingly-independent systems that come to reach synchrony just before a state of self-organized criticality.

==== Evolution of cognitive coordination dynamics ====
The HKB model has been reconciled with advanced mathematical models and supercomputer-based computation to link rudimentary coordination dynamics to higher-order processes such as learning and memory.

The traditional EEG is still useful to investigate coordination between different parts of the brain. 40 Hz gamma wave activity is a prominent example of the brain's ability to be modeled dynamically and is a common example of coordination dynamics. Continuous study of these and other oscillations has led to an important conclusion: analyzing waves as having a common signal phase but a different amplitude leads to the possibility that these different signals serve a synergistic function.

Some unusual characteristics of these waves are that they are virtually simultaneous and have a very short onset latency, which implies that they operate faster than synaptic conduction would allow; and that their recognizable patterns are sometimes interrupted by periods of randomness. The latter idiosyncrasy has served as the basis for assuming an interaction and transition between neural subsystems. Analysis of activation and deactivation of regions of the cortex has shown a dynamic shift between dependence and interdependence, reflecting the brain's metastable nature as a function of a coordinated dynamical system.

fMRI, large-scale electrode arrays, and MEG expand upon the patterns seen in EEG by providing visual confirmation of coordinated dynamics. The MEG, which provides an improvement over EEG in spatiotemporal characterization, allows researchers to stimulate certain parts of the brain with environmental cues and observe the response in a holistic brain model. Additionally, MEG has a response time of about one millisecond, allowing for a virtually real-time investigation of the active turning-on and -off of selected parts of the brain in response to environmental cues and conscious tasks.

==== Social coordination dynamics and the phi complex ====
A developing field in coordination dynamics involves the theory of social coordination, which attempts to relate the DC to normal human development of complex social cues following certain patterns of interaction. This work is aimed at understanding how human social interaction is mediated by metastability of neural networks. fMRI and EEG are particularly useful in mapping thalamocortical response to social cues in experimental studies.

A new theory called the phi complex has been developed by J. A. Scott Kelso and fellow researchers at Florida Atlantic University to provide experimental results for the theory of social coordination dynamics. In Kelso's experiments, two subjects were separated by an opaque barrier and asked to wag their fingers; then the barrier was removed and the subjects were instructed to continue to wag their fingers as if no change had occurred. After a short period, the movements of the two subjects sometimes became coordinated and synchronized (but other times continued to be asynchronous). The link between EEG and conscious social interaction is described as Phi, one of several brain rhythms operating in the 10 Hz range. Phi consists of two components: one to favor solitary behavior and another to favor interactive (interpersonal) behavior. Further analysis of Phi may reveal the social and interpersonal implications of degenerative diseases such as schizophrenia—or may provide insight into common social relationships such as the dynamics of alpha and omega-males or the popular bystander effect describing how people diffuse personal responsibility in emergency situations depending on the number of other individuals present.

=== Dynamic core ===
A second theory of metastability involves a so-called dynamic core, which is a term to loosely describe the thalamocortical region believed to be the integration center of consciousness. The dynamic core hypothesis (DCH) reflects the use and disuse of interconnected neuronal networks during stimulation of this region. A computer model of 65,000 spiking neurons shows that neuronal groups existing in the cortex and thalamus interact in the form of synchronous oscillation. The interaction between distinct neuronal groups forms the dynamic core and may help explain the nature of conscious experience. A critical feature of the DCH is that instead of thinking binarily about transitions between neural integration and non-integration (i.e., that the two are either one or the other with no in-between), the metastable nature of the dynamic core can allow for a continuum of integration.

==== Neural Darwinism ====
One theory used to integrate the dynamic core with conscious thought involves a developing concept known as neural Darwinism. In this model, metastable interactions in the thalamocortical region cause a process of selectionism via re-entry (a phenomenon describing the overall reciprocity and interactivity between signals in distant parts of the brain through coupled signal latency). Neuronal selectivity involves mechanochemical events that take place pre- and post-natally whereby neuronal connections are influenced by environmental experiences. The modification of synaptic signals as it relates to the dynamic core provides further explanation for the DCH.

Despite growing evidence for the DCH, the ability to generate mathematical constructs to model and predict dynamic core behavior has been slow to progress. Continued development of stochastic processes designed to graph neuronal signals as chaotic and non-linear has provided some algorithmic basis for analyzing how chaotic environmental signals are coupled to enhance selectivity of neural outgrowth or coordination in the dynamic core.

=== Global workspace hypothesis ===
The global workspace hypothesis is another theory to elucidate metastability, and has existed in some form since 1983. This hypothesis also focuses on the phenomenon of re-entry, the ability of a routine or process to be used by multiple parts of the brain simultaneously. Both the DCH and global neuronal workspace (GNW) models involve re-entrance, but the GNW model elaborates on re-entrant connectivity between distant parts of the brain and long-range signal flow. Workspace neurons are similar anatomically but separated spatially from each other.

One interesting aspect of the GNW is that with sufficient intensity and length over which a signal travels, a small initiation signal can be compounded to activate an "ignition" of a critical spike-inducing state. This idea is analogous to a skier on the slope of a mountain, who, by disrupting a few blocks of ice with his skis, initiates a giant avalanche in his wake. To help prove the circuit-like amplification theory, research has shown that inducing lesions in long-distance connections corrupts performance in integrative models.

A popular experiment to demonstrate the global workspace hypothesis involves showing a subject a series of backward-masked visual words (e.g., "the dog sleeps quietly" is shown as "ylteiuq speels god eht") and then asking the subject to identify the forward "translation" of these words. Not only did fMRI detect activity in the word-recognition portion of the cortex, but additionally, activity is often detected in the parietal and prefrontal cortices. In almost every experiment, conscious input in word and audition tasks shows a much wider use of integrated portions of the brain than in identical unconscious input. The wide distribution and constant signal transfer between different areas of the brain in experimental results is a common method to attempt to prove the neural workspace hypothesis. More studies are being conducted to determine precisely the correlation between conscious and unconscious task deliberation in the realm of the global workspace.

=== The operational architectonics theory of brain–mind ===
Although the concept of metastability has been around in Neuroscience for some time, the specific interpretation of metastability in the context of brain operations of different complexity has been developed by Andrew and Alexander Fingelkurts within their model of Operational Architectonics of brain–mind functioning. Metastability is basically a theory of how global integrative and local segregative tendencies coexist in the brain. The Operational Architectonics is centered on the fact that in the metastable regime of brain functioning, the individual parts of the brain exhibit tendencies to function autonomously at the same time as they exhibit tendencies for coordinated activity. In accordance with Operational Architectonics, the synchronized operations produced by distributed neuronal assemblies constitute the metastable spatial-temporal patterns. They are metastable because intrinsic differences in the activity between neuronal assemblies are sufficiently large that they each do their own job (operation), while still retaining a tendency to be coordinated together in order to realize the complex brain operation.

== The future of metastability ==
In addition to study investigating the effects of metastable interactions on traditional social function, much research will likely focus on determining the role of the coordinated dynamic system and the global workspace in the progression of debilitating diseases such as Alzheimer's disease, Parkinson's disease, stroke, and schizophrenia.

An interest in the effect of a traumatic or semi-traumatic brain injury (TBI) on the coordinated dynamical system has developed in the last five years as the number of TBI cases has risen from war-related injuries.

== See also ==
- Cognitive psychology
- Electroencephalogram
