= Integer =

Number in {..., –2, –1, 0, 1, 2, ...}

The integers arranged on a number line

An integer is the number zero (0), a positive natural number (1, 2, 3, ...), or the negation of a positive natural number (−1, −2, −3, ...). The negations or additive inverses of the positive natural numbers are referred to as negative integers. The set of all integers is often denoted by the boldface Z or blackboard bold $\Z$.

The set of natural numbers $\N$ is a subset of $\Z$, which in turn is a subset of the set of all rational numbers $\Q$, itself a subset of the real numbers $\R$. (Note: More precisely, each system is embedded in the next, isomorphically mapped to a subset. The commonly-assumed set-theoretic containment may be obtained by constructing the reals, discarding any earlier constructions, and defining the other sets as subsets of the reals.) Like the set of natural numbers, the set of integers $\Z$ is countably infinite. An integer may be regarded as a real number that can be written without a fractional component. For example, 21, 4, 0, and −2048 are integers, while 9.75, 5 1/2, 5/4, and the square root of 2 are not.

The integers form the smallest group and the smallest ring containing the natural numbers. In algebraic number theory, integers are sometimes called rational integers to distinguish them from the more general algebraic integers. In fact, (rational) integers are algebraic integers that are also rational numbers.

== History ==
The word integer comes from the Latin integer meaning "whole" or (literally) "untouched", from in ("not") plus tangere ("to touch"). "Entire" derives from the same origin via the French word entier, which means both entire and integer. Historically the term was used for a number that was a multiple of 1, or to the whole part of a mixed number. Only positive integers were considered, making the term synonymous with the natural numbers. The definition of integer expanded over time to include negative numbers as their usefulness was recognized. For example Leonhard Euler in his 1765 Elements of Algebra defined integers to include both positive and negative numbers.

The phrase the set of the integers was not used before the end of the 19th century, when Georg Cantor introduced the concept of infinite sets and set theory. The use of the letter Z to denote the set of integers comes from the German word Zahlen ("numbers") and has been attributed to David Hilbert. The earliest known use of the notation in a textbook occurs in Algèbre written by the collective Nicolas Bourbaki, dating to 1947. The notation was not adopted immediately. For example, another textbook used the letter J, and a 1960 paper used Z to denote the non-negative integers. But by 1961, Z was generally used by modern algebra texts to denote the positive and negative integers.

The symbol $\Z$ is often annotated to denote various sets, with varying usage amongst different authors: $\Z^+$, $\Z_+$, or $\Z^>$ for the positive integers, $\Z^{0+}$ or $\Z^\geq$ for non-negative integers, and $\Z^\neq$ for non-zero integers. Some authors use $\Z^*$ for non-zero integers, while others use it for non-negative integers, or for {−1,1} (the group of units of $\Z$). Additionally, $\Z_p$ is used to denote either the set of integers modulo p (i.e., the set of congruence classes of integers), or the set of p-adic integers.

The whole numbers were synonymous with the integers up until the early 1950s. In the late 1950s, as part of the New Math movement, American elementary school teachers began teaching that whole numbers referred to the natural numbers, excluding negative numbers, while integer included the negative numbers. The whole numbers remain ambiguous to the present day.

== Algebraic properties ==
Integers can be thought of as discrete, equally spaced points on an infinitely long number line. In the above, non-negative integers are shown in blue and negative integers in red.

Like the natural numbers, $\Z$ is closed under the operations of addition and multiplication, that is, the sum and product of any two integers is an integer. However, with the inclusion of 0 and the negation of the natural numbers, $\Z$, unlike the natural numbers, is also closed under subtraction.

The integers form a ring which is the most basic one, in the following sense: for any ring, there is a unique ring homomorphism from the integers into this ring. This universal property, namely to be an initial object in the category of rings, characterizes the ring $\Z$. This unique homomorphism is injective if and only if the characteristic of the ring is zero. It follows that every ring of characteristic zero contains a subring isomorphic to $\Z$, which is its smallest subring.

$\Z$ is not closed under division, since the quotient of two integers (e.g., 1 divided by 2) need not be an integer. Although the natural numbers are closed under exponentiation, the integers are not (since the result can be a fraction when the exponent is negative).

The following table lists some of the basic properties of addition and multiplication for any integers a, b, and c:

Properties of addition and multiplication on integers
	Addition	Multiplication
Closure:	a + b is an integer	a × b is an integer
Associativity:	a + (b + c) = (a + b) + c	a × (b × c) = (a × b) × c
Commutativity:	a + b = b + a	a × b = b × a
Existence of an identity element:	a + 0 = a	a × 1 = a
Existence of inverse elements:	a + (−a) = 0	The only invertible integers (called units) are −1 and 1.
Distributivity:	a × (b + c) = (a × b) + (a × c) and (a + b) × c = (a × c) + (b × c)	
No zero divisors:		If a × b = 0, then a = 0 or b = 0 (or both)

The first five properties listed above for addition say that $\Z$, under addition, is an abelian group. It is also a cyclic group, since every non-zero integer can be written as a finite sum 1 + 1 + ... + 1 or (−1) + (−1) + ... + (−1). In fact, $\Z$ under addition is the only infinite cyclic group—in the sense that any infinite cyclic group is isomorphic to $\Z$.

The first four properties listed above for multiplication say that $\Z$ under multiplication is a commutative monoid. However, not every integer has a multiplicative inverse (as is the case of the number 2), which means that $\Z$ under multiplication is not a group.

All the rules from the above property table (except for the last), when taken together, say that $\Z$ together with addition and multiplication is a commutative ring with unity. It is the prototype of all objects of such algebraic structure. Only those equalities of expressions are true in $\Z$ for all values of variables, which are true in any unital commutative ring. Certain non-zero integers map to zero in certain rings.

The lack of zero divisors in the integers (last property in the table) means that the commutative ring $\Z$ is an integral domain.

The lack of multiplicative inverses, which is equivalent to the fact that $\Z$ is not closed under division, means that $\Z$ is not a field. The smallest field containing the integers as a subring is the field of rational numbers. The process of constructing the rationals from the integers can be mimicked to form the field of fractions of any integral domain. And back, starting from an algebraic number field (an extension of rational numbers), its ring of integers can be extracted, which includes $\Z$ as its subring.

Although ordinary division is not defined on $\Z$, the division "with remainder" is defined on them. It is called Euclidean division, and possesses the following important property: given two integers a and b with b ≠ 0, there exist unique integers q and r such that a = q × b + r and 0 ≤ r < |b|, where |b| denotes the absolute value of b. The integer q is called the quotient and r is called the remainder of the division of a by b. The Euclidean algorithm for computing greatest common divisors works by a sequence of Euclidean divisions.

The above says that $\Z$ is a Euclidean domain. This implies that $\Z$ is a principal ideal domain, and any positive integer can be written as the products of primes in an essentially unique way. This is the fundamental theorem of arithmetic.

== Order-theoretic properties ==
$\Z$ is a totally ordered set without upper or lower bound. The ordering of $\Z$ is given by:
$$\cdots < -3 < -2 < -1 < 0 < 1 < 2 < 3 < \cdots.$$
An integer is positive if it is greater than zero, and negative if it is less than zero. Zero is defined as neither negative nor positive.

The ordering of integers is compatible with the algebraic operations in the following way:

1. If a < b and c < d, then a + c < b + d
2. If a < b and 0 < c, then ac < bc

Thus it follows that $\Z$ together with the above ordering is an ordered ring.

The integers are the only nontrivial totally ordered abelian group whose positive elements are well-ordered. This is equivalent to the statement that any Noetherian valuation ring is either a field—or a discrete valuation ring.

== Construction ==
=== Traditional development ===
In elementary school teaching, integers are often intuitively defined as the union of the (positive) natural numbers, zero, and the negations of the natural numbers. This can be formalized as follows. First construct the set of natural numbers according to the Peano axioms, call this $P$. Then construct a set $P^-$ which is disjoint from $P$ and in one-to-one correspondence with $P$ via a function $\psi$. For example, take $P^-$ to be the ordered pairs $(1,n)$ with the mapping $\psi = n \mapsto (1,n)$. Finally let 0 be some object not in $P$ or $P^-$, for example the ordered pair (0,0). Then the integers are defined to be the union $P \cup P^- \cup \{0\}$.

The traditional arithmetic operations can then be defined on the integers in a piecewise fashion, for each of positive numbers, negative numbers, and zero. For example negation is defined as follows:

$$-x = \begin{cases}
\psi(x), & \text{if } x \in P \\
\psi^{-1}(x), & \text{if } x \in P^- \\
0, & \text{if } x = 0
\end{cases}$$

The traditional style of definition leads to many different cases (each arithmetic operation needs to be defined on each combination of types of integer) and makes it tedious to prove that integers obey the various laws of arithmetic.

=== Equivalence classes of ordered pairs ===
Red points represent ordered pairs of natural numbers. Linked red points are equivalence classes representing the blue integers at the end of the line.

In modern set-theoretic mathematics, a more abstract construction allowing one to define arithmetical operations without any case distinction is often used instead. The integers can thus be formally constructed as the equivalence classes of ordered pairs of natural numbers (a,b).

The intuition is that (a,b) stands for the result of subtracting b from a. To confirm our expectation that 1 − 2 and 4 − 5 denote the same number, we define an equivalence relation ~ on these pairs with the following rule:

$$(a,b)\sim(c,d)$$

precisely when

$$a+d=b+c$$.

Addition and multiplication of integers can be defined in terms of the equivalent operations on the natural numbers; by using [(a,b)] to denote the equivalence class having (a,b) as a member, one has:

$$[(a,b)]+[(c,d)]:=[(a+c,b+d)]$$.
$$[(a,b)]\cdot[(c,d)]:=[(ac+bd,ad+bc)]$$.

The negation (or additive inverse) of an integer is obtained by reversing the order of the pair:

$$-[(a,b)]:=[(b,a)]$$.

Hence subtraction can be defined as the addition of the additive inverse:

$$[(a,b)]-[(c,d)]:=[(a+d,b+c)]$$.

The standard ordering on the integers is given by:

$[(a,b)]<[(c,d)]$ if and only if $a+d<b+c$.

It is easily verified that these definitions are independent of the choice of representatives of the equivalence classes.

Every equivalence class has a unique member that is of the form (n,0) or (0,n) (or both at once). The natural number n is identified with the class [(n,0)] (i.e., the natural numbers are embedded into the integers by map sending n to [(n,0)]), and the class [(0,n)] is denoted −n (this covers all remaining classes, and gives the class [(0,0)] a second time since −0 = 0.

Thus, [(a,b)] is denoted by

$$\begin{cases}
a-b,&\mbox{if }a\ge b\\
-(b-a),&\mbox{if }a<b
\end{cases}$$

If the natural numbers are identified with the corresponding integers (using the embedding mentioned above), this convention creates no ambiguity.

This notation recovers the familiar representation of the integers as {..., −2, −1, 0, 1, 2, ...} .

Some examples are:

$$\begin{alignat}{3}
0  &= [(0,0)] &&= [(1,1)] &&= \ \cdots \ &&= [(k,k)],\\
1  &= [(1,0)] &&= [(2,1)] &&= \ \cdots \ &&= [(k+1,k)],\\
-1 &= [(0,1)] &&= [(1,2)] &&= \ \cdots \ &&= [(k,k+1)],\\
2  &= [(2,0)] &&= [(3,1)] &&= \ \cdots \ &&= [(k+2,k)],\\
-2 &= [(0,2)] &&= [(1,3)] &&= \ \cdots \ &&= [(k,k+2)].
\end{alignat}$$

=== Other approaches ===
In theoretical computer science, other approaches for the construction of integers are used by automated theorem provers and term rewrite engines. Integers are represented as algebraic terms built using a few basic operations (e.g., zero, succ, pred) and using natural numbers, which are assumed to be already constructed (using the Peano approach).

There exist at least ten such constructions of signed integers. These constructions differ in several ways: the number of basic operations used for the construction, the number (usually, between 0 and 2), and the types of arguments accepted by these operations; the presence or absence of natural numbers as arguments of some of these operations, and the fact that these operations are free constructors or not, i.e., that the same integer can be represented using only one or many algebraic terms.

The technique for the construction of integers presented in the previous section corresponds to the particular case where there is a single basic operation pair$(x,y)$ that takes as arguments two natural numbers $x$ and $y$, and returns an integer (equal to $x-y$). This operation is not free since the integer 0 can be written pair(0,0), or pair(1,1), or pair(2,2), etc.. This technique of construction is used by the proof assistant Isabelle; however, many other tools use alternative construction techniques, notable those based upon free constructors, which are simpler and can be implemented more efficiently in computers.

== Computer science ==
An integer is often a primitive data type in computer languages. However, integer data types can only represent a subset of all integers, since practical computers are of finite capacity. Also, in the common two's complement representation, the inherent definition of sign distinguishes between "negative" and "non-negative" rather than "negative, positive, and 0". (It is, however, certainly possible for a computer to determine whether an integer value is truly positive.) Fixed length integer approximation data types (or subsets) are denoted int or Integer in several programming languages (such as Algol68, C, Java, Delphi, etc.).

Variable-length representations of integers, such as bignums, can store any integer that fits in the computer's memory. Other integer data types are implemented with a fixed size, usually a number of bits which is a power of 2 (4, 8, 16, etc.) or a memorable number of decimal digits (e.g., 9 or 10).

== Cardinality ==
The set of integers is countably infinite, meaning it is possible to pair each integer with a unique natural number. An example of such a pairing is

(0, 1), (1, 2), (−1, 3), (2, 4), (−2, 5), (3, 6), . . . ,(1 − k, 2k − 1), (k, 2k ), . . .

More technically, the cardinality of $\Z$ is said to equal ℵ_{0} (aleph-null). The pairing between elements of $\Z$ and $\N$ is called a bijection.

== See also ==
- Canonical factorization of a positive integer
- Complex integer
- Hyperinteger
- Integer complexity
- Integer lattice
- Integer part
- Integer sequence
- Integer-valued function
- Mathematical symbols
- Parity (mathematics)
- Profinite integer

Set inclusions between the natural numbers ($\mathbb{N}$), the integers ($\mathbb{Z}$), the rational numbers ($\mathbb{Q}$), the real numbers ($\mathbb{R}$), and the complex numbers ($\mathbb{C}$)

== Sources ==
- Bell, E.T. (1986). Men of Mathematics. New York: Simon & Schuster. ISBN 0-671-46400-0.)
- Herstein, I.N. (1975). Topics in Algebra (2nd ed.). Wiley. ISBN 0-471-01090-1.
- Mac Lane, Saunders; Birkhoff, Garrett (1999). Algebra (3rd ed.). American Mathematical Society. ISBN 0-8218-1646-2.
- A Society of Gentlemen in Scotland (1771). Encyclopaedia Britannica. Edinburgh.
