= Complexity (disambiguation) =

Complexity is the property of a system to defy full description.

Complexity may also refer to:

== Arts and entertainment ==
- Complexity Gaming, an American esports organization
- "Complexity", a song by Eagles of Death Metal from Zipper Down, 2015
- "Complexity", a song by Front Line Assembly from the re-release of the album The Initial Command, 1997
- "Complexity", a song by Madison Beer from Locket, 2026
- "Complexities", a song by Daniel Caesar from Case Study 01, 2019

== Mathematics and science ==
- Complexity (journal)
- Computational complexity, of algorithms
  - Computational complexity theory
- Game complexity, in combinatorial game theory
- Integer complexity, in number theory
- Language complexity, a linguistic hypothesis

== See also ==
- Complex (disambiguation)
- Complexity theory (disambiguation)
