= Peter V. E. McClintock =

British physicist

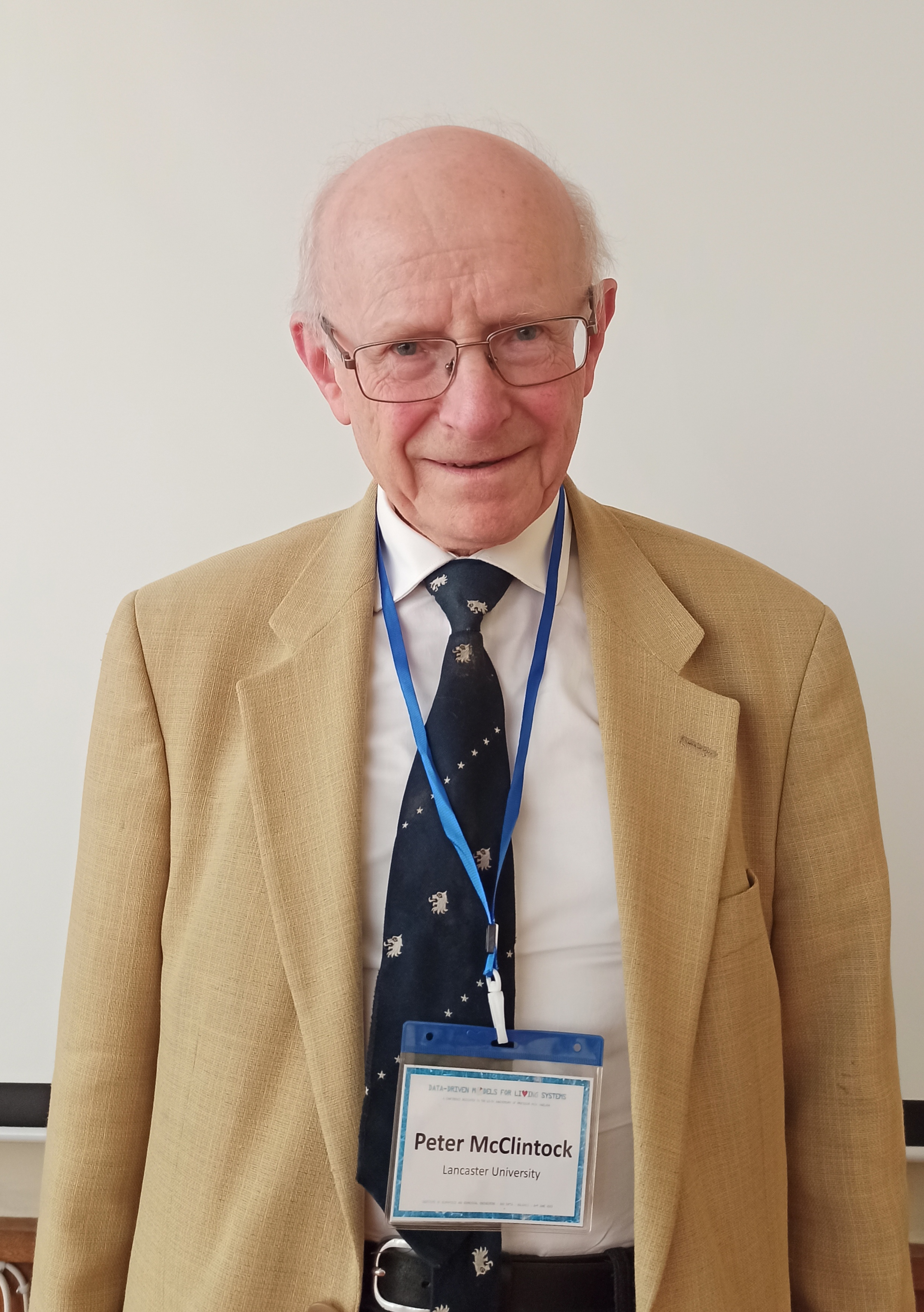
- Peter McClintock, June 2023
- Born: 17 October 1940 (age 85); Omagh, Northern Ireland
- Education: Queen's University, Belfast; University of Oxford
- Known for: Superfluids
- Scientific career
- Fields: Physicist
- Workplaces: Lancaster University
- Doctoral advisor: Harold Max Rosenberg
- Doctoral students: Nigel G. Stocks

Peter Vaughan Elsmere McClintock (born 17 October 1940) is a Northern Irish physicist notable for his scientific work on superfluids and stochastic nonlinear dynamics.

== Education ==
He received the B.Sc. degree in physics in 1962 and the D.Sc. degree from Queen's University, Belfast, Northern Ireland. He completed his D.Phil. at Oxford University in 1966, under Harold Max Rosenberg, with a thesis entitled Experiments on Spin Phonon Interactions in the area of paramagnetic crystals at very low temperatures.

== Career ==
He performed postdoctoral research on superfluid helium at Duke University, Durham, North Carolina. He joined Lancaster University, UK, in 1968, where he is now a professor of physics. His research interests span superfluid helium-4, medical physics, and stochastic nonlinear dynamics. The particular sub-topics are: (a) magnetism including, especially, studies of spin-phonon interactions in rare-earth ethylsulphate crystals; (b) quantum fluids and liquid helium-4 in particular; (c) nonlinear dynamics and fluctuational phenomena including applications to physiology. Since 2009, he is the editor-in-chief of Fluctuation and Noise Letters.

== Honors ==
McClintock is a fellow of the Institute of Physics.

== Books by McClintock ==
- Aneta Stefanovska and P. V. E. McClintock (Eds.), Physics of Biological Oscillators: New Insights into Non-Equilibrium and Non-Autonomous Systems, Springer, 2021.
- Frank Moss and P. V. E. McClintock (Eds.), Noise in Nonlinear Dynamical Systems, Cambridge University Press, 1989, ISBN 0521352290.
- P. V. E. McClintock, D. J. Meredith and J. K. Wigmore, Low-Temperature Physics: An Introduction for Scientists and Engineers, Blackie, 1992, ISBN 0-216-92979-2.
- P. V. E. McClintock, D. J. Meredith and J. K. Wigmore, Matter at Low Temperatures, Blackie, 1984, ISBN 0-216-91594-5.
