= MNE-Python =

Software

- Written in: Python
- Operating system: All OS supported by Python
- Available in: English
- Type: Neuroimaging software
- Website: mne.tools/stable/index.html

MNE-Python ("MNE") is an open source toolbox for EEG and MEG signal processing. It is written in Python and is available from the PyPI package repository.

== See also ==
- Neurophysiological Biomarker Toolbox (MatLab)
- EEGLAB (MatLab)
- NeuroKit (Python)
