= Aneta Stefanovska =

Slovenian-British biophysicist

Aneta Stefanovska is a Macedonian-born, Slovenian-British biophysicist. She is a professor of physics at Lancaster University.

== Research ==
Stefanovska's research concerns biological oscillations, particularly in the blood circulatory system, and their analysis using wavelets, nonlinear systems, and the Kuramoto model for systems of coupled oscillators. With Peter V. E. McClintock, she is co-editor of the book Physics of Biological Oscillators: New Insights into Non-Equilibrium and Non-Autonomous Systems (Springer, 2021).

She has also performed research on the genetic basis for periodic breathing, one of the symptoms of altitude sickness.

== Education and career ==
Stefanovska earned a master's degree in electrical and computer engineering at the University of Ljubljana in 1988, and completed her PhD there in 1992 with the dissertation Self-organisation of Biological Systems Influenced By Electric Currents, under the joint supervision of Lojze Vodovnik and Hermann Haken. As a student, she worked with Haken at the University of Stuttgart in Germany.

She headed the group of nonlinear dynamics and synergetics as a faculty member at the University of Ljubljana, before moving to Lancaster, where she has been a professor since 2010.
