= Haken-Kelso-Bunz model =

Theoretical model of motor coordination

The Haken-Kelso-Bunz (HKB) is a theoretical model of motor coordination originally formulated by Hermann Haken, J. A. Scott Kelso and H. Bunz. The model attempts to provide the framework for understanding coordinated behavior in living things. It accounts for experimental observations on human bimanual coordination that revealed fundamental features of self-organization: multistability, and phase transitions (switching). HKB is one of the most extensively tested quantitative models in the field of human movement behavior.

== Phase Transitions ('Switches') ==
The HKB model differs from other motor coordination models with the addition of phase transitions (‘switches’). Kelso initially observed this phenomenon while conducting an experiment looking at subjects’ finger movements. Subjects oscillated their fingers rhythmically in the transverse plane (i.e., abduction-adduction) in one of two patterns, parallel or anti-parallel. In the parallel pattern, the finger muscles contract in an alternating fashion; in the anti-parallel pattern, the homologous finger muscles contract simultaneously. Kelso's study observed that when the subject begins in the parallel mode and increases the speed of movement, a spontaneous switch to symmetrical, anti-parallel movement occurs. This transition happens swiftly at a certain critical frequency. Surprisingly, after the switch has occurred and the movement rate decreases, Kelso's subjects remain in the symmetrical model (did not switch back). Kelso's study indicates that while humans are able to produce two patterns at low frequency values, only one—the symmetrical, anti-parallel mode remains stable as frequency is scaled beyond a critical value.

== Prediction ==
The HKB model states that dynamic instability causes switching to occur. HKB measures stability in the following ways: 1. Critical slowing down. If a perturbation is applied to a system that takes it away from its stationary state, the time for a system to return to the stationary state (local relaxation time) is a measure of the system's stability. The less stable the pattern, the longer it should take to return to the established pattern. HKB predicts critical slowing down. As the parallel pattern loses stability as frequency is increased, the local relaxation time should increase as the system approaches the critical point. 2. Critical fluctuations. If switching patterns of behavior is due to loss of stability, direct measures of fluctuations of the order parameter should be detectable as the critical point approaches.

== Equation ==
In the HKB model ϕ is the relative phase or phase relation between the fingers. The parameter k in the model has a correspondence to the cycle-to-cycle period of the finger movements, or, the inverse of the movement rate or oscillation frequency in the experiment.

The equation:

$$\phi \prime = -\sin \phi  - 2 k \sin 2 \phi$$

The equation predicts that for k > 0.25 relative phase values of 0 ±π are both stable, a condition coined as bistability. An increase in movement rate, starting in parallel-phase, leads to a switch to anti-parallel phase at a critical frequency. Starting with a large k and decreasing k leads to a destabilization of the fixed point at π which becomes unstable at the value kc=0.25.

== Uses ==
The HKB model has had a profound effect on many conceptual, methodological, and practical models since its inception. HKB has been able to model task context, biomechanical factors, perception, cognitive demands, learning and memory. The latest noninvasive neuroimaging methods such as fMRI, MEG and high density EEG arrays are increasingly being used along with behavioral recordings and analysis to identify the neural circuitry and mechanisms of pattern stability and switching.

== See also ==
- Excitator model
