= Complexity theory =

Complexity theory may refer to:

== Theories ==
- Computational complexity theory, a field in theoretical computer science and mathematics
- Assembly theory, to quantify the complexity of molecules and objects

== Complex systems ==
- Complex systems, describing systems of many interacting parts
  - Complex adaptive system, a special case of complex systems
- Complexity economics, the application of complex systems to economics
- Complexity theory and organizations, the application of complex systems to strategy

== See also ==
- Computational complexity
- Complexity
- Complexity (disambiguation)
- Systems theory
- Systems thinking
- Complex network
