= Marguerite Delorme =

French painter

- Born: September 10, 1876; Lunéville, France
- Died: July 26, 1946 (aged 69); Lille, France
- Known for: Painting
- Movement: Orientalism

Marguerite-Anne-Rose Delorme (10 September 1876 - 26 July 1946) was a French painter known for her Orientalist and genre paintings.

== Biography ==
Delorme was born on September 10, 1876, in Lunéville, France into an upper-middle-class family. Her father, Edmond Delorme, was a military doctor and would later found the museum of Lunéville.

She showed an early interest in art. Her early paintings depicted themes of the family environment. She also found inspirations in Brittany where she spent the summer with the Merson family.

She studied under Raphaël Collin, Paul Leroy and Luc-Olivier Merson in their private workshops, but was unable to enter the Ecole de Beaux Artes which at the time did not accept female artists. In 1897, Delorme became a member of the Sociétaire des Artistes Français where she exhibited her paintings, winning Honorable Mention in 1897 and Medal of Third Class in 1901.

In 1905, she won a scholarship which allowed her to travel to Italy. This trip introduced her to different light conditions which had an influence on her style. During the first world war, Delorme began painting the Senegalese riflemen encountered in the "wintering camps". These works were presented in 1921 and she won the Compagnie Générale Transatlantique Prize. Following this, she found inspiration in North African themes by travelling Morocco, where she journeyed around the entire country painting scenes of everyday life.

Delorme died July 26, 1946, in Lille, France. Her work has been in the public domain since January 1, 2017.

== Legacy ==
In 2013 the Musée du château des Lumières held a retrospective of Delorme's work.

== Gallery ==
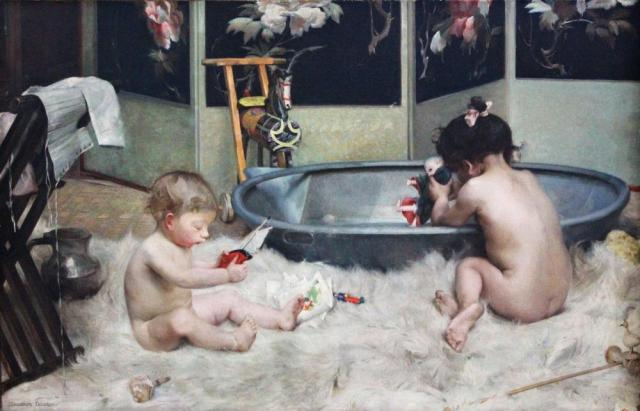

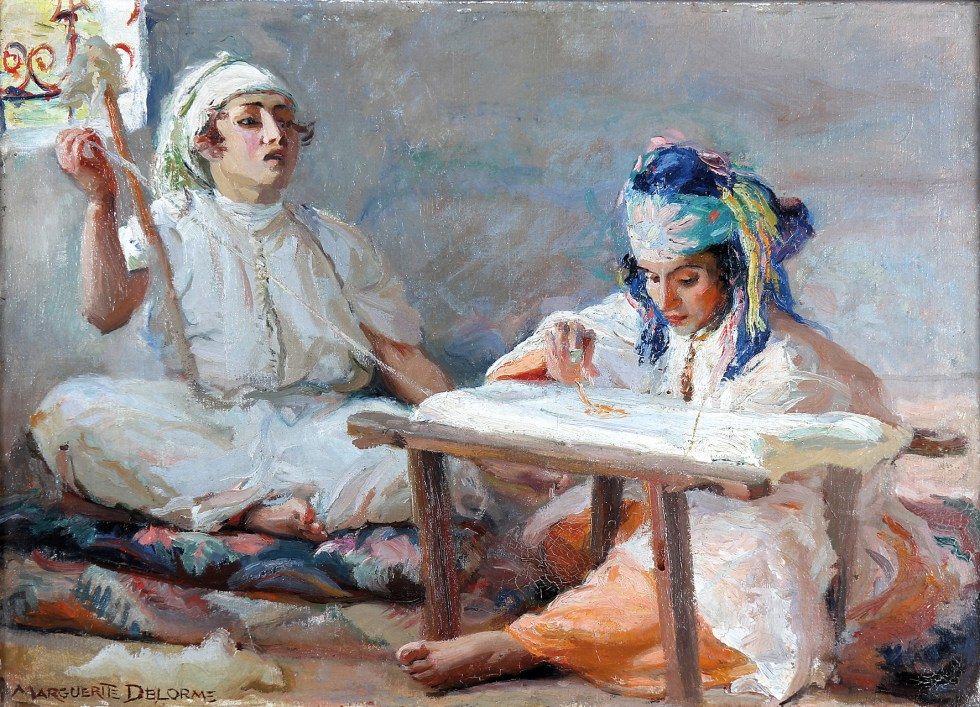

== See also ==
- List of Orientalist artists
- Orientalism
