= Synergetics (Haken) =

Interdisciplinary science

Synergetics is an interdisciplinary science explaining the formation and self-organization of patterns and structures in open systems far from thermodynamic equilibrium. It is founded by Hermann Haken, inspired by the laser theory. Haken's interpretation of the laser principles as self-organization of non-equilibrium systems paved the way at the end of the 1960s to the development of synergetics. One of his successful popular books is Erfolgsgeheimnisse der Natur, translated into English as The Science of Structure: Synergetics.

Self-organization requires a 'macroscopic' system, consisting of many nonlinearly interacting subsystems. Depending on the external control parameters (environment, energy fluxes) self-organization takes place.

== Order-parameter concept ==
Essential in synergetics is the order-parameter concept which was originally introduced in the Ginzburg–Landau theory in order to describe phase transitions in thermodynamics. The order parameter concept is generalized by Haken to the "enslaving-principle" saying that the dynamics of fast-relaxing (stable) modes is completely determined by the 'slow' dynamics of, as a rule, only a few 'order-parameters' (unstable modes). The order parameters can be interpreted as the amplitudes of the unstable modes determining the macroscopic pattern.

As a consequence, self-organization means an enormous reduction of degrees of freedom (entropy) of the system which macroscopically reveals an increase of 'order' (pattern-formation). This far-reaching macroscopic order is independent of the details of the microscopic interactions of the subsystems. This supposedly explains the self-organization of patterns in so many different systems in physics, chemistry and biology.

[...] the statistical properties of laser light change qualitatively at the laser threshold. Below laser threshold noise increases more and more while above threshold it decreases again. [...] Below laser threshold, light consists of individual wave tracks which are emitted from the individual atoms independently of each other. Above laser threshold, a practically infinitely long wave track is produced. In order to make contact with other processes of self-organization let us interpret the processes in a lamp or in a laser by means of Bohr's model of the atom. A lamp produces its light in such a way that the excited electrons of the atoms make their transitions from the outer orbit to the inner orbit entirely independently of each other. On the other hand, the properties of laser light can be understood only if we assume that the transitions of the individual electrons occur in a correlated fashion. [...] Above laser threshold the coherent field grows more and more and it can slave the degrees of freedom of the dipole moments and of the inversion. Within synergetics it has turned out that is a quite typical equation describing effects of self-organization. [...] This equation tells us that the amplitude of the dipoles, which is proportional to A, is instantaneously given by the field amplitude B(t) (and by the fluctuating force). This is probably the simplest example of a principle which has turned out to be of fundamental importance in synergetics and which is called the slaving principle.

— Light: vol. 2; Laser light dynamics, chapter 13.

== See also ==
- Abiogenesis
- Alexander Bogdanov
- Buckminster Fuller
- Effective field theory
- Free energy principle
- Fokker–Planck equation
- Ginzburg–Landau theory
- Josiah Willard Gibbs
- Phase rule
- Synergetics (Fuller)
