= Complex (English band) =

English rock band

- Origin: Blackpool, England
- Genres: Psychedelic rock
- Years active: 1968-1978, 2008-2013
- Past members: Brian Lee; Tony Shakespeare; Lance Fogg; Tony Fisher; Steve Coe; Keith Shackleton

Complex were a rock band formed in 1968 consisting of lead guitarist Brian Lee, lead vocalist and drummer Tony Shakespeare, bass guitarist Lance Fogg and rhythm guitarist Tony Fisher, four musicians from England. After some initial personnel changes, in early 1970 the line-up consisted of Lee, Shakespeare and Fogg with the addition of Steve Coe on keyboards. Steve Coe was later replaced by Keith Shackleton on Keyboards and synths. They were based in Blackpool.

In November 1970 they cut their first album, entitled simply "Complex", which was released in May 1971. Originally devised as a demonstration record (demo) for bringing the band to the attention of major record companies for the purpose of obtaining a recording contract, it was recorded at "107 Studio" in St. Annes, engineered and mixed down by Graham Atkinson. 99 (vinyl) copies of the album were pressed by Craighall Studios in Scotland. The reason for such a limited release was the imposition of Purchase Tax on quantities greater than 99. Due to a manufacturing defect, the sleeve was slightly smaller than the record, so plain white sleeves were used to store both the album and sleeve. The album went on to become quite famous in "psych" album circles - "... one of the 'Holy Trinity' items of rare British psychedelia ..." and at one stage was fetching $6,000 on eBay for each copy.

Later in 1971, they recorded a second album, The Way We Feel, released in August that year. In 1972, they recorded demos for a third album, however the album never advanced beyond the demos, which themselves were unavailable to the general public until 2022. Included among the demos were covers of Redbone's "The Witch Queen of New Orleans" and Isaac Hayes' "Shaft". In 1976, the band released a single, "Who Got the Love". This was their final release.

In 1978, Complex attempted a comeback with a punk-influenced sound, changing their name to Yo-Yo. The only known song from this period was a demo called "Dial 999" which was written by Keith Shackleton. By this time, Shakespeare switched to performing vocals exclusively. Yo-Yo disbanded after a final gig on Christmas Eve 1978.

An unauthorised bootleg of the self-titled debut was made in 1991, released on Swank Records. 1999 limited-edition re-releases of both Complex and The Way We Feel were authorised by the band on Wooden Hill records (Vinyl and CD versions). This was of much better quality soundwise, had bonus tracks and was quickly sold out. In 2011, Complex was reissued on CD without the bonus tracks but including an interview with the band members. The following year, Spanish label Guerssen reissued both albums on 180g vinyl, with the original artwork and based on the 1999 remasters.

In 2008, Complex reunited as a band that played cover songs at events such as weddings and parties. This incarnation of the band disbanded in 2013, and Steve Coe died that August.

On Record Store Day 2021, Manchester record store Vinyl Revival released a new remaster of Complex. In early 2022, Cherry Red Records released Live for the Minute, a three-disc box set containing Complex, The Way We Feel and a third disc containing the 1972 acetate, the "Who Got the Love" single and several other unreleased tracks spanning the band's history. This compilation garnered a three and a half stars rating (out of five) at All Music, with Tim Sendra writing "Too bad Complex were never able to break through during their own time; now that their music is finally readily available, any fan of music from this confusing era should definitely check out this worthwhile collection." Later in 2022, French label Long Hair reissued both of Complex' albums on vinyl, under licence from Cherry Red and including a small selection of the bonus tracks from the CD release.

== Discography ==
- Complex (May 1971)
- The Way We Feel (August 1971)
- Untitled (demos for planned follow-up to The Way We Feel, 1972)
- "Who Got the Love" (1976)
