= Karl Delorme =

German politician (1920–2011)

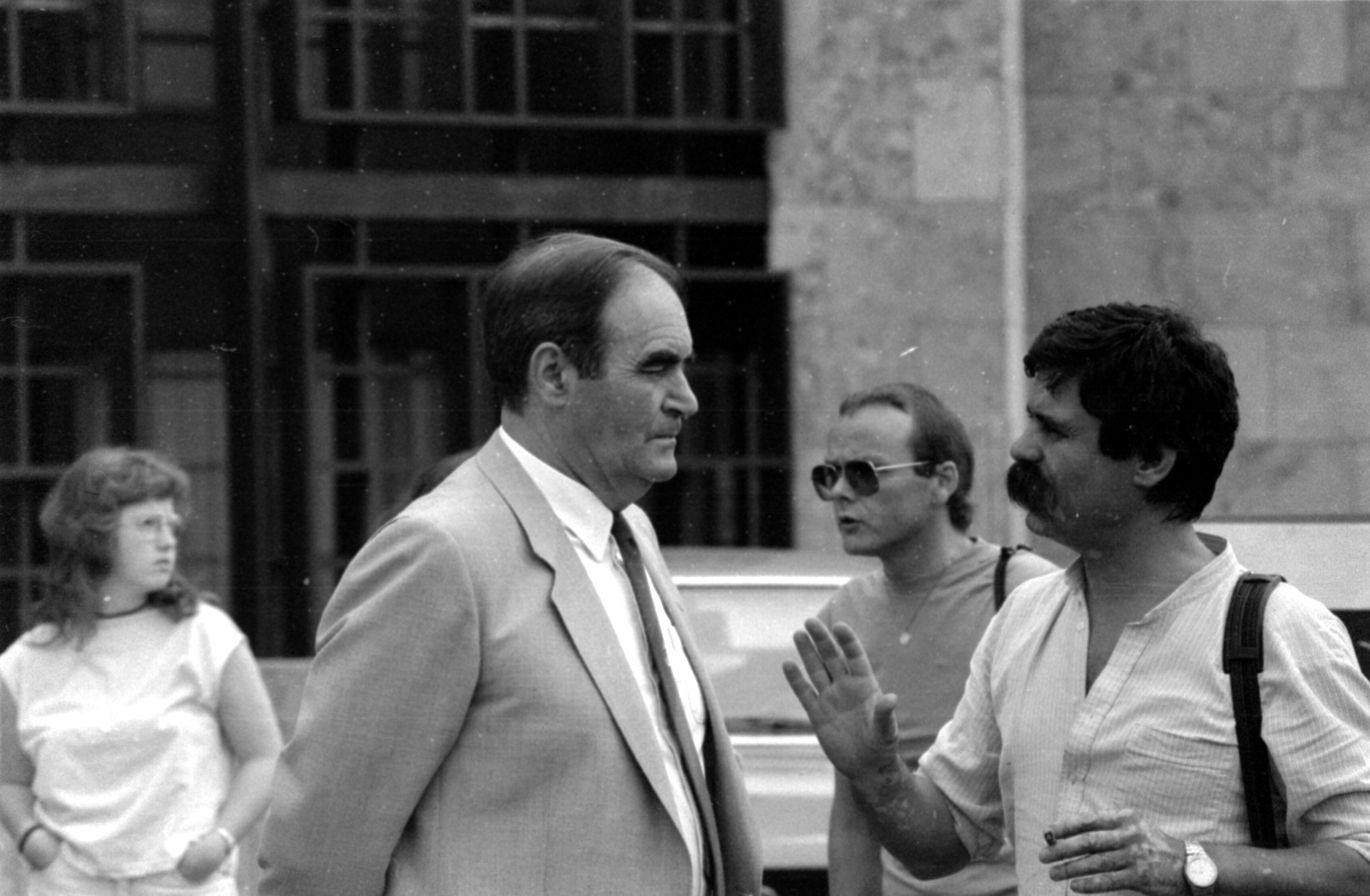
- Karl Delorme on 31 August 1985 in Mainz

Member of the Bundestag
- In office 29 March 1983 – 18 February 1987

Personal details
- Born: 23 January 1920 Mainz
- Died: 12 March 2011 (aged 91)
- Party: SPD

Karl Delorme (23 January 1920 – 12 March 2011) was a German politician of the Social Democratic Party (SPD) and member of the German Bundestag.

== Life ==
Delorme was a member of the German Bundestag for one term from 29 March 1983 to 18 February 1987. He was elected via the state list of the SPD Rhineland-Palatinate.

== Literature ==
Herbst, Ludolf; Jahn, Bruno (2002). Vierhaus, Rudolf (ed.). Biographisches Handbuch der Mitglieder des Deutschen Bundestages. 1949–2002 [Biographical Handbook of the Members of the German Bundestag. 1949–2002] (in German). München: De Gruyter - De Gruyter Saur. p. 1715. ISBN 978-3-11-184511-1.
