= Rafael Delorme =

Spanish writer and journalist

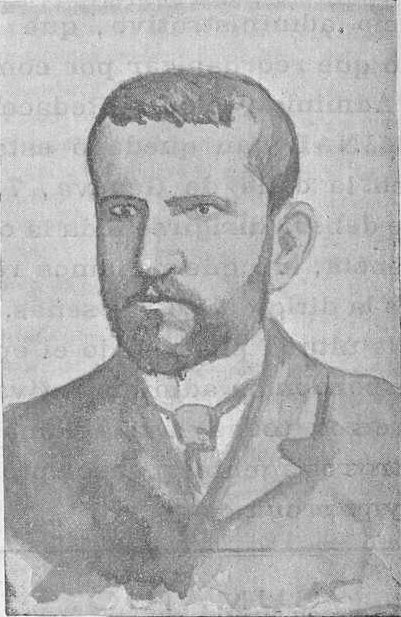
- Died: November 29, 1897 (aged 30); Madrid
- Occupations: Writer and journalist

Rafael Delorme Salto (1867–1897), born in the province of Malaga was a Spanish writer, journalist, and freethinker. He was a defender of the autonomy of Cuba and the author of several works of a historical and political nature.

== Work ==
=== Books ===
- The aborigines of America. Disquisitions about the seat, origin, history and advancement in the scientific sphere of pre-Columbian societies . Foreword by D. Vicente Riva-Palacio and Guerrero, Madrid: Bookstore of Fernando Faith / The Literary Propaganda, 1894.
- Cuba and the colonial reform in Spain . Madrid. Imp. D. Pacheco, 1895.
- Necessity of lay teaching and reforms to be introduced into it. Memory read by Rafael Delorme Salto at the Republican Youth session held on March 18, 1890. Madrid: Ricardo Fé's typographic establishment, 1890.
