= Arnaud Delorme =

Professor

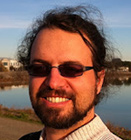
- Citizenship: France
- Scientific career
- Fields: Neuroscience
- Workplaces: University of California, San Diego
- Academic advisors: Terrence Sejnowski, Scott Makeig
- Website: sccn.ucsd.edu/~arno/

Arnaud Delorme is a research scientist at the Swartz Center for Computational Neuroscience at the University of California, San Diego. At UCSD, Dr. Delorme contributed to development of the widely used Matlab toolbox for electroencephalography (EEG) analysis, EEGLAB. He has been acknowledged for his contribution to the field of EEG research by being awarded a Bettencourt-Schueller young investigator award in 2002 and one of three of the ANT EEG Company 10-year Anniversary Young Researcher Awards in 2006. His research has focused on pure neuroscience methods, as well as on the neuroscience of mind wandering, meditation, and so-called mediums.
