= Integer complexity =

Length of expression as combination of 1s

In number theory, the complexity of an integer is the smallest number of ones that can be used to represent it using ones and any number of additions, multiplications, and parentheses. It is always within a constant factor of the logarithm of the given integer.

== Example ==
For instance, the number 11 may be represented using eight ones:

11 = (1 + 1 + 1) × (1 + 1 + 1) + 1 + 1.

However, it has no representation using seven or fewer ones. Therefore, its complexity is 8.

The complexities of the numbers 1, 2, 3, ... are

1, 2, 3, 4, 5, 5, 6, 6, 6, 7, 8, 7, 8, 8, 8, 8, 9, 8, ... (sequence A005245 in the OEIS)

The smallest numbers with complexity 1, 2, 3, ... are

1, 2, 3, 4, 5, 7, 10, 11, 17, 22, 23, 41, 47, ... (sequence A005520 in the OEIS)

== Upper and lower bounds ==
The question of expressing integers in this way was originally considered by Mahler & Popken (1953). They asked for the largest number with a given complexity k; later, Selfridge showed that this number is

$$2^x3^{(k-2x)/3} \text{ where } x = -k\bmod 3.$$

For example, when k = 10, x = 2 and the largest integer that can be expressed using ten ones is 2^{2} 3^{2} = 36. Its expression is

(1 + 1) × (1 + 1) × (1 + 1 + 1) × (1 + 1 + 1).

Thus, the complexity of an integer n is at least 3 log_{3} n. The complexity of n is at most 3 log_{2} n (approximately 4.755 log_{3} n): an expression of this length for n can be found by applying Horner's method to the binary representation of n. Almost all integers have a representation whose length is bounded by a logarithm with a smaller constant factor, 3.529 log_{3} n.

== Algorithms and counterexamples ==
The complexity $\|n\|$ of every integer n up to some threshold N can be calculated in total time $O(N\log^{O(1)}N)$. The complexity of a single integer $n$ can be computed in sublinear time, $O(n^{0.6514})$.

Algorithms for computing the integer complexity have been used to disprove several conjectures about the complexity. In particular, it is not necessarily the case that the optimal expression for a number n is obtained either by subtracting one from n or by expressing n as the product of two smaller factors. The smallest example of a number whose optimal expression is not of this form is 353942783. It is a prime number, and therefore also disproves a conjecture of Richard K. Guy that the complexity of every prime number p is one plus the complexity of p − 1. In fact,
$$\|353942783\| = \|353942782\| = 63.$$
Moreover, Venecia Wang gave examples of other numbers whose integer complexity does not reflect the obvious formula for these numbers:
$$\begin{align}
\|743 \times 2\| = \|743\| &= 22 \\
\|166571 \times 3\| = \|166571\| &= 39 \\
\|97103 \times 5\| = \|97103\| &= 38 \\
2 \|23\| > \|23^2\| &= 20.\\
\end{align}$$
