= Synergetics (Fuller) =

Empirical study of systems in transformation

Synergetics is the empirical study of systems in transformation, with an emphasis on whole system behaviors unpredicted by the behavior of any components in isolation. R. Buckminster Fuller (1895–1983) named and pioneered the field. His two-volume work Synergetics: Explorations in the Geometry of Thinking, in collaboration with E. J. Applewhite, distills a lifetime of research into book form.

Since systems are identifiable at every scale, synergetics is necessarily interdisciplinary, embracing a broad range of scientific and philosophical topics, especially in the area of geometry, wherein the tetrahedron features as Fuller's model of the simplest system.

Despite mainstream endorsements such as the prologue by Arthur Loeb, and positive dust cover blurbs by U Thant and Arthur C. Clarke, along with the posthumous naming of the carbon allotrope "buckminsterfullerene", synergetics remains an off-beat subject, ignored for decades by most traditional curricula and academic departments, a fact Fuller himself considered evidence of a dangerous level of overspecialization.

His oeuvre inspired many developers to further pioneer offshoots from synergetics, especially geodesic dome and dwelling designs. Among Fuller's contemporaries were Joe Clinton (NASA), Don Richter (Temcor), Kenneth Snelson (tensegrity), J. Baldwin (New Alchemy Institute), and Medard Gabel (World Game). His chief assistants Amy Edmondson and Ed Popko have published primers that help popularize synergetics, Stafford Beer extended synergetics to applications in social dynamics, and J.F. Nystrom proposed a theory of computational cosmography. Research continues.

== Definition ==
Fuller defined synergetics as follows:

A system of mensuration employing 60-degree vectorial coordination comprehensive to both physics and chemistry, and to both arithmetic and geometry, in rational whole numbers ... Synergetics explains much that has not been previously illuminated ... Synergetics follows the cosmic logic of the structural mathematics strategies of nature, which employ the paired sets of the six angular degrees of freedom, frequencies, and vectorially economical actions and their multi-alternative, equi-economical action options ... Synergetics discloses the excruciating awkwardness characterizing present-day mathematical treatment of the interrelationships of the independent scientific disciplines as originally occasioned by their mutual and separate lacks of awareness of the existence of a comprehensive, rational, coordinating system inherent in nature.

Other passages in Synergetics that outline the subject are its introduction (The Wellspring of Reality) and the section on Nature's Coordination (410.01). The chapter on Operational Mathematics (801.00-842.07) provides an easy-to-follow, easy-to-build introduction to some of Fuller's geometrical modeling techniques. So this chapter can help a new reader become familiar with Fuller's approach, style and geometry. One of Fuller's clearest expositions on "the geometry of thinking" occurs in the two-part essay "Omnidirectional Halo" which appears in his book No More Secondhand God.

Amy Edmondson describes synergetics "in the broadest terms, as the study of spatial complexity, and as such is an inherently comprehensive discipline." In her PhD study, Cheryl Clark synthesizes the scope of synergetics as "the study of how nature works, of the patterns inherent in nature, the geometry of environmental forces that impact on humanity."

Here's an abridged list of some of the discoveries Fuller claims for Synergetics again quoting directly:

- The rational volumetric quantation or constant proportionality of the octahedron, the cube, the rhombic triacontahedron, and the rhombic dodecahedron when referenced to the tetrahedron as volumetric unity.
- The trigonometric identification of the great-circle trajectories of the seven axes of symmetry with the 120 basic disequilibrium LCD triangles of the spherical icosahedron. (See Sec. 1043.00.)
- The A and B Quanta Modules.
- Omnirationality: the identification of triangling and tetrahedroning with second- and third-powering factors.
- Omni-60-degree coordination versus 90-degree coordination.
- The integration of geometry and philosophy in a single conceptual system providing a common language and accounting for both the physical and metaphysical.

== Significance ==
Several authors have tried to characterize the importance of synergetics. Amy Edmonson asserts that "Experience with synergetics encourages a new way of approaching and solving problems. Its emphasis on visual and spatial phenomena combined with Fuller's holistic approach fosters the kind of lateral thinking which so often leads to creative breakthroughs.". Cheryl Clark points out that "In his thousands of lectures, Fuller urged his audiences to study synergetics, saying 'I am confident that humanity's survival depends on all of our willingness to comprehend feelingly the way nature works.'"

== Tetrahedral accounting ==
A chief hallmark of this system of mensuration is its unit of volume: a tetrahedron defined by four closest-packed unit-radius spheres. This tetrahedron anchors a set of concentrically arranged polyhedra proportioned in a canonical manner and inter-connected by a twisting-contracting, inside-outing dynamic that Fuller named the jitterbug transformation.

Shape	Volume	Properties
A, B, T modules	1/24	tetrahedral voxels
E module	$\sqrt{2}\phi^{-3}/8$	tetrahedral voxel
S module	$\phi^{-5}/2$	tetrahedral voxel
MITE	1/8	space-filler, 2As + 1B
Tetrahedron	1	self dual, unit volume
Coupler	1	space filling oblate octa
Cuboctahedron	2.5	edges 1/2, vol. = 1/8 of 20
Duo-Tet Cube	3	24 MITEs
Octahedron	4	dual of cube, spacefills w/ tet
Rhombic Triacontahedron	5	radius = ~0.9994, vol. = 120 Ts
Rhombic Triacontahedron	5+	radius = 1, vol. = 120 Es
Rhombic Dodecahedron	6	space-filler, dual to cuboctahedron
Rhombic Triacontahedron	7.5	radius = phi/sqrt(2)
Icosahedron	$5\sqrt{2}\phi^{2}$	edges 1 = tetrahedron edge
Cuboctahedron	20	edges 1, radii = 1
2F Cube	24	2-frequency, 8 x 3 volume

Shape	Volume	A	B	T
A module	1/24	1	0	0
B module	1/24	0	1	0
T module	1/24	0	0	1
MITE	1/8	2	1	0
Tetrahedron	1	24	0	0
Coupler	1	16	8	0
Duo-Tet Cube	3	48	24	0
Octahedron	4	48	48	0
Rhombic Triacontahedron	5	0	0	120
Rhombic Dodecahedron	6	96	48	0
Cuboctahedron	20	336	144	0
2F Cube	24	384	192	0

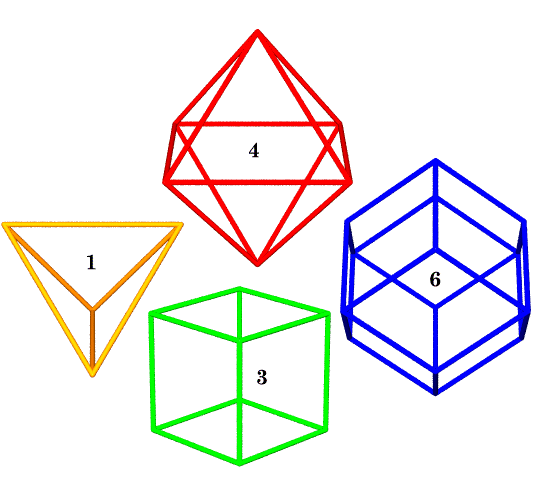
Whole number volumes

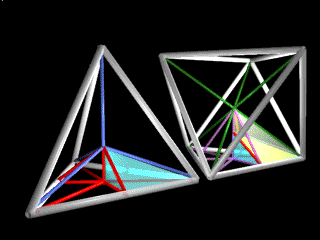
A & B modules

Concentric Hierarchy of Polyhedrons

Corresponding to Fuller's use of a regular tetrahedron as his unit of volume is his replacing the cube as his model of 3rd powering.(Fig. 990.01) The relative size of a shape is indexed by its "frequency," a term he deliberately chose for its resonance with scientific meanings. "Size and time are synonymous. Frequency and size are the same phenomenon." (528.00) Shapes not having any size, because purely conceptual in the Platonic sense, are "prefrequency" or "subfrequency" in contrast.

Prime means sizeless, timeless, subfrequency. Prime is prehierarchical. Prime is prefrequency. Prime is generalized, a metaphysical conceptualization experience, not a special case.... (1071.10)

Generalized principles (scientific laws), although communicated energetically, do not inhere in the "special case" episodes, are considered "metaphysical" in that sense.

An energy event is always special case. Whenever we have experienced energy, we have special case. The physicist's first definition of physical is that it is an experience that is extracorporeally, remotely, instrumentally apprehensible. Metaphysical includes all the experiences that are excluded by the definition of physical. Metaphysical is always generalized principle.(1075.11)

Tetrahedral mensuration also involves substituting what Fuller calls the "isotropic vector matrix" (IVM) for the standard XYZ coordinate system, as his principal conceptual backdrop for special case physicality:

The synergetics coordinate system -- in contradistinction to the XYZ coordinate system -- is linearly referenced to the unit-vector-length edges of the regular tetrahedron, each of whose six unit vector edges occur in the isotropic vector matrix as the diagonals of the cube's six faces. (986.203)

The IVM scaffolding or skeletal framework is defined by cubic closest packed spheres (CCP), alternatively known as the FCC or face-centered cubic lattice, or as the octet truss in architecture (on which Fuller held a patent). The space-filling complementary tetrahedra and octahedra characterizing this matrix have prefrequency volumes 1 and 4 respectively (see above).

A third consequence of switching to tetrahedral mensuration is Fuller's review of the standard "dimension" concept. Whereas "height, width and depth" have been promulgated as three distinct dimensions within the Euclidean context, each with its own independence, Fuller considered the tetrahedron a minimal starting point for spatial cognition. His use of "4D" is in many passages close to synonymous with the ordinary meaning of "3D," with the dimensions of physicality (time, mass) considered additional dimensions.

Geometers and "schooled" people speak of length, breadth, and height as constituting a hierarchy of three independent dimensional states -- "one-dimensional," "two-dimensional," and "three-dimensional" -- which can be conjoined like building blocks. But length, breadth, and height simply do not exist independently of one another nor independently of all the inherent characteristics of all systems and of all systems' inherent complex of interrelationships with Scenario Universe.... All conceptual consideration is inherently four-dimensional. Thus the primitive is a priori four-dimensional, always based on the four planes of reference of the tetrahedron. There can never be less than four primitive dimensions. Any one of the stars or point-to-able "points" is a system-ultratunable, tunable, or infratunable but inherently four-dimensional. (527.702, 527.712)

Synergetics does not aim to replace or invalidate pre-existing geometry or mathematics, as evidenced by the opening dedication to H.S.M. Coxeter, whom Fuller considered the greatest geometer of his era. Fuller acknowledges his vocabulary is "remote" even while defending his word choices. (250.30)

== Starting with Universe ==
Fuller's geometric explorations provide an experiential basis for designing and refining a philosophical language. His overarching concern is the co-occurring relationship between tensile and compressive tendencies within an eternally regenerative Universe. "Universe" is a proper name he defines in terms of "partially overlapping scenarios" while avoiding any static picture or model of same. His Universe is "non-simultaneously conceptual":

Because of the fundamental nonsimultaneity of universal structuring, a single, simultaneous, static model of Universe is inherently both nonexistent and conceptually impossible as well as unnecessary. Ergo, Universe does not have a shape. Do not waste your time, as man has been doing for ages, trying to think of a unit shape "outside of which there must be something," or "within which, at center, there must be a smaller something." (307.04)

U = MP describes a first division of Universe into metaphysical and physical aspects, the former associated with invisibly cohesive tension, the latter with energy events, both associative as matter and disassociative as radiation. (162.00)

Synergetics also distinguishes between gravitational and precessional relationships among moving bodies, the latter referring to the vast majority of cosmic relationships, which are non-180-degree and do not involve bodies "falling in" to one another (130.00 533.01, 1009.21). "Precession" is a nuanced term in the synergetics vocabulary, relating to the behavior of gyroscopes, but also to side-effects. (326.13, 1009.92)

== Intuitive geometry ==
Fuller took an intuitive approach to his studies, often going into exhaustive empirical detail while at the same time seeking to cast his findings in their most general philosophical context.

For example, his sphere packing studies led him to generalize a formula for polyhedral numbers: 2 P F^{2} + 2, where F stands for "frequency" (the number of intervals between balls along an edge) and P for a product of low order primes (some integer). He then related the "multiplicative 2" and "additive 2" in this formula to the convex versus concave aspects of shapes, and to their polar spinnability respectively.

These same polyhedra, developed through sphere packing and related by tetrahedral mensuration, he then spun around their various poles to form great circle networks and corresponding triangular tiles on the surface of a sphere. He exhaustively catalogues the central and surface angles of these spherical triangles and their related chord factors.

Fuller was continually on the lookout for ways to connect the dots, often purely speculatively. As an example of "dot connecting" he sought to relate the 120 basic disequilibrium LCD triangles of the spherical icosahedron to the plane net of his A module.(915.11Fig. 913.01, Table 905.65)

The Jitterbug Transformation provides a unifying dynamic in this work, with much significance attached to the doubling and quadrupling of edges that occur, when a cuboctahedron is collapsed through icosahedral, octahedral and tetrahedral stages, then inside-outed and re-expanded in a complementary fashion. The JT forms a bridge between 3,4-fold rotationally symmetric shapes, and the 5-fold family, such as a rhombic triacontahedron, which later he analyzes in terms of the T module, another tetrahedral wedge with the same volume as his A and B modules.

He models energy transfer between systems by means of the double-edged octahedron and its ability to turn into a spiral (tetrahelix). Energy lost to one system always reappeared somewhere else in his Universe. He modeled a threshold between associative and disassociative energy patterns with his T-to-E module transformation ("E" for "Einstein").(Fig 986.411A)

"Synergetics" is in some ways a library of potential "science cartoons" (scenarios) described in prose and not heavily dependent upon mathematical notations. His demystification of a gyroscope's behavior in terms of a hammer thrower, pea shooter, and garden hose, is a good example of his commitment to using accessible metaphors. (Fig. 826.02A)

His modular dissection of a space-filling tetrahedron or MITE (minimum tetrahedron) into 2 A and 1 B module serves as a basis for more speculations about energy, the former being more energy conservative, the latter more dissipative in his analysis.(986.422921.20, 921.30). His focus is reminiscent of later cellular automaton studies in that tessellating modules would affect their neighbors over successive time intervals.

== Social commentary ==
Synergetics informed Fuller's social analysis of the human condition. He identified "ephemeralization" as the trend towards accomplishing more with less physical resources, as a result of increasing comprehension of such "generalized principles" as E = Mc^{2}.

He remained concerned that humanity's conditioned reflexes were not keeping pace with its engineering potential, emphasizing the "touch and go" nature of our current predicament.

Fuller hoped the streamlining effects of a more 60-degree-based approach within natural philosophy would help bridge the gap between C.P. Snow's "two cultures" and result in a greater level of scientific literacy in the general population. (935.24)

== Academic acceptance ==
Fuller hoped to gain traction for his nomenclature in part by dedicating Synergetics to H.S.M. Coxeter (with permission) and by citing page 71 of the latter's Regular Polytopes in order to suggest where his A & B modules (depicted above), and by extension, many of his other concepts, might enter the mathematical literature (see Fig. 950.12).

Dr. Arthur Loeb provided a prologue and an appendix to Synergetics discussing its overlap with crystallography, chemistry and virology.

Fuller originally achieved more acceptance in the humanities as a poet-philosopher and architect. For example, he features in The Pound Era by Hugh Kenner published in 1971, prior to the publication of Synergetics. The journal Nature circled Operating Manual for Spaceship Earth as one of the five most formative books on sustainability.

== Errata ==
A major error, caught by Fuller himself, involved a misapplication of his Synergetics Constant in Synergetics 1, which led to the mistaken belief he had discovered a radius 1 sphere of 5 tetravolumes. He provided a correction in Synergetics 2 in the form of his T&E module thread. (986.206 - 986.212)

== About synergy ==
Synergetics refers to synergy: either the concept of whole system behaviors not predicted by the behaviors of its parts, or as another term for negative entropy — negentropy.

== See also ==
- Cloud Nine
- Dymaxion house
- Quadray coordinates
- Tensegrity
- Trilinear coordinates
