= Hermann Haken =

German physicist (1927–2024)

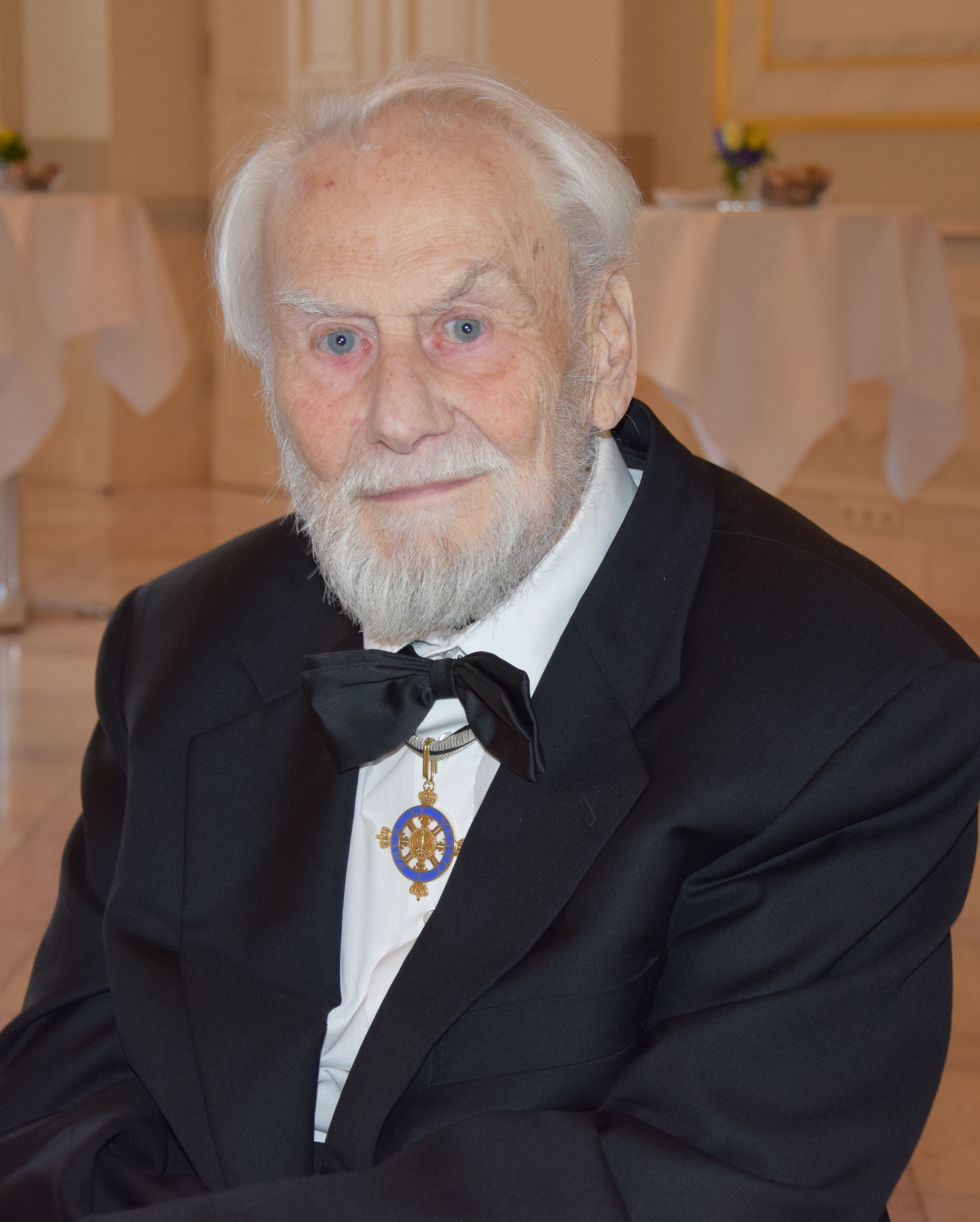
- Haken in 2014
- Born: 12 July 1927; Leipzig, Saxony, Germany
- Died: 14 August 2024 (aged 97)
- Education: University of Erlangen
- Known for: Synergetics; Haken–Kelso–Bunz model
- Awards: Honda Prize (1992); Max Planck Medal (1990); Pour le Mérite for Sciences and Arts (1984); Albert Michelson Medal (1981); Max Born Medal and Prize (1976)
- Scientific career
- Workplaces: University of Stuttgart
- Thesis: Zum Identitätsproblem bei Gruppen
- Doctoral advisor: Wilhelm Specht
- Doctoral students: Aneta Stefanovska

Hermann Haken (German: [ˈhɛʁ.man ˈhaːkŋ̩]; 12 July 1927 – 14 August 2024) was a German physicist and professor emeritus in theoretical physics at the University of Stuttgart. He is known as the founder of synergetics and one of the "fathers" of quantum-mechanical laser theory. He is a cousin of the mathematician Wolfgang Haken, who proved the Four color theorem. He was a nephew of Werner Haken, a doctoral student of Max Planck.

== Biography ==
After his studies in mathematics and physics in Halle (Saale) and Erlangen, receiving his PhD in mathematics in 1951 at the University of Erlangen and being guest lecturer at universities in the UK and US, Haken was appointed a full professor in theoretical physics at the University of Stuttgart. His research has been in non linear optics (his specialities are laser physics, particle physics, statistical physics and group theory).

Haken developed his institute in a relatively short time to be an international centre for laser theory, starting in 1960 when Theodore Maiman built the first experimental laser. The interpretation of the laser principles as self-organization of non equilibrium systems paved the way at the end of the 1960s to the development of synergetics, of which Haken is recognized as the founder. Haken is the author of some 23 textbooks and monographs that cover an impressive number of topics from laser physics, atomic physics, quantum field theory, to synergetics. Although Haken's early books tend to be rather mathematical, at least one of his books Light is nicely written, for the more general reader, and loaded with physical insights. One of his successful popular books is Erfolgsgeheimnis der Natur, or in English, The Science of Structure: Synergetics. Haken also showed interest in Grey system theory.

For his wide range of contributions, he received many international prizes or medals, including the Max Born Medal and Prize by the British Institute of Physics and the German Physical Society in 1976, Albert A. Michelson Medal of the Franklin Institute, Philadelphia, 1981, Great Order of the Federal Republic of Germany with star in 1986, Max Planck medal in 1990, Honda Prize 1992, Arthur-Burkhardt-Prize in 1993, Lorenz-Oken-Medal of the Society of German Natural Scientists and Medical Doctors in 1994, and Prize for the Outstanding Contributions to the Development of Medicine and Psychology, Danube University Krems, in 2005.

Haken died on 14 August 2024, at the age of 97.
