= Albert-László Barabási =

Hungarian-American physicist (born 1967)

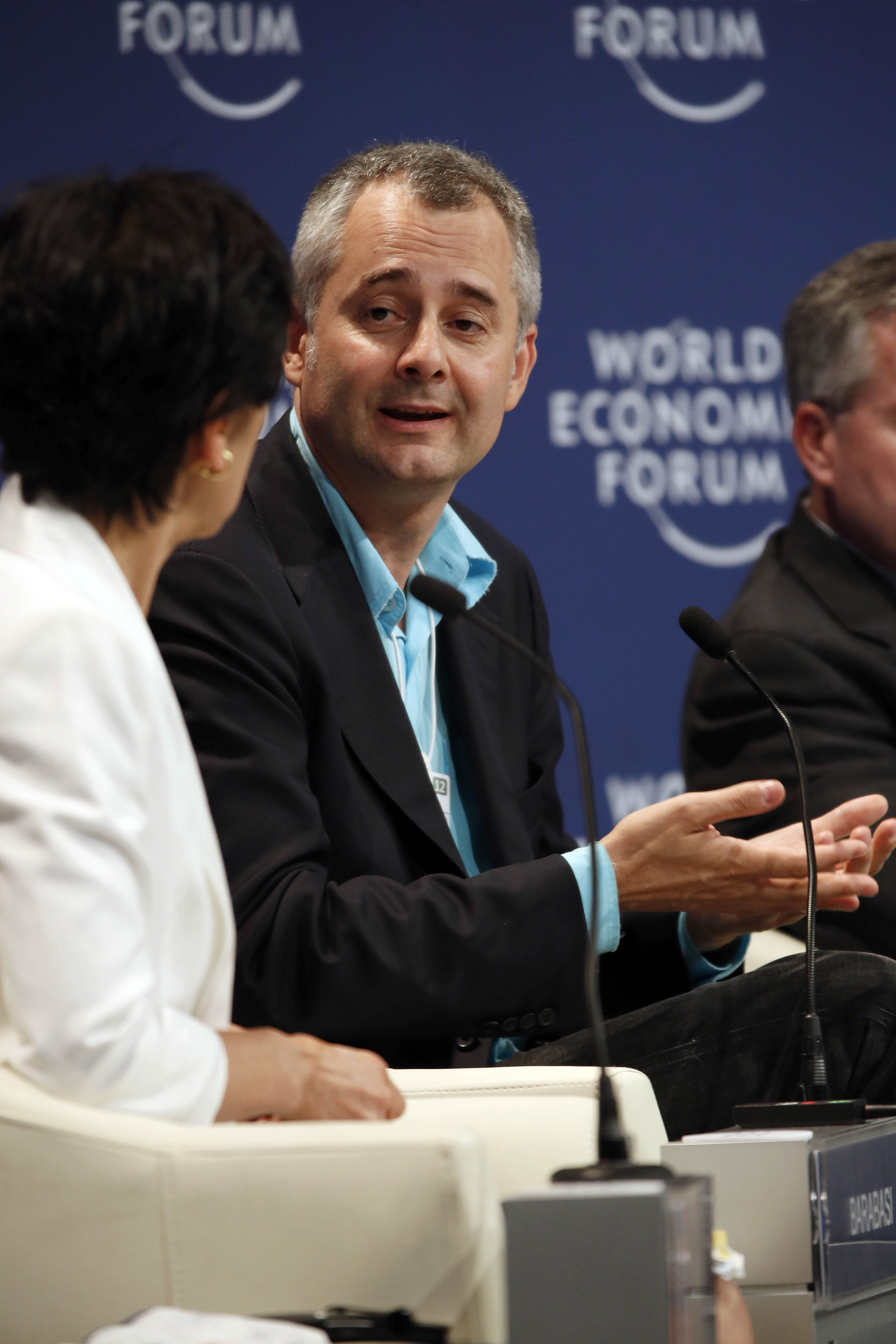
- Barabási at the World Economic Forum Annual Meeting of the New Champions in 2012
- Born: Barabási Albert László; March 30, 1967 (age 59); Cârța, Harghita County, SR Romania
- Education: University of Bucharest; Eötvös Loránd University (MS); Boston University (PhD)
- Known for: Research of network science The concept of scale-free networks Proposal of Barabási–Albert model Founder of Network Medicine; Introducing Network controllability
- Awards: Gothenburg Lise Meitner Award (2024); Lilienfeld Prize, APS (2023); EPS Statistical and Nonlinear Physics Prize (2021); Lagrange Prize (2011); C&C Prize, NEC, Japan (2008)
- Scientific career
- Fields: Physics, Network Science, Network Medicine
- Thesis: Growth and roughening of non-equilibrium interfaces (1994)
- Doctoral advisor: H. Eugene Stanley
- Doctoral students: Ginestra Bianconi; Reka Albert; César Hidalgo; Dashun Wang
- Website: barabasilab.com

Albert-László Barabási (born March 30, 1967) is a Romanian-born Hungarian-American physicist, known for his research in network science and network medicine.

He is a distinguished university professor and Robert Gray Professor of Network Science at Northeastern University, holding additional appointments at the Department of Medicine, Harvard Medical School and the Department of Network and Data Science at Central European University. Barabási previously served as the former Emil T. Hofmann Professor of Physics at the University of Notre Dame and was an associate member of the Center of Cancer Systems Biology at the Dana–Farber Cancer Institute, Harvard University.

In 1999 Barabási discovered the concept of scale-free networks and proposed the Barabási–Albert model, which explains the widespread emergence of such networks in natural, technological and social systems, including the World Wide Web and online communities. Barabási is the founding president of the Network Science Society, which sponsors the flagship NetSci Conference established in 2006.

== Birth and education ==
Barabási was born on March 30, 1967 to an ethnic Hungarian family in Cârța, Harghita County, Romania. His father, László Barabási, was a historian, museum director and writer, while his mother, Katalin Keresztes, taught literature, and later became director of a children's theater. He attended a high school specializing in science and mathematics; where he won a local physics olympiad in the 9th and 12th grade. Between 1986 and 1989, he studied physics at the University of Bucharest; during which time he began researching chaos theory and published three papers.

In 1989, Barabási emigrated to Hungary, together with his father. He received a master's degree in 1991 at Eötvös Loránd University in Budapest, under the supervision of Tamás Vicsek. Barabási then enrolled in the Physics program at Boston University, where he earned his PhD in 1994. His doctoral thesis, conducted under the direction of H. Eugene Stanley, was published by Cambridge University Press under the title Fractal Concepts in Surface Growth.

== Academic career ==
After a one-year postdoc at the IBM Thomas J. Watson Research Center, Barabási joined the faculty at the University of Notre Dame in 1995. In 2000, at the age of 32, he was named the Emil T. Hofman Professor of Physics, becoming the youngest endowed professor. In 2004 he founded the Center for Complex Network Research.

In 2005–6 he was a visiting professor at Harvard University. In fall 2007, Barabási left Notre Dame to become a Distinguished University Professor and director of the Center for Network Science at Northeastern University. Concurrently, he took up an appointment in the Department of Medicine at Harvard Medical School.

As of 2008, Barabási holds Hungarian, Romanian and U.S. citizenship.

== Research and achievements ==
=== Scale-free networks ===
Barabási's work challenged the prevailing notion that complex networks could be adequately modeled as random networks. In 1999 he created a map of the World Wide Web and found that its degree distribution does not follow the Poisson distribution expected for random networks, but instead it is best approximated by a power law, naming such networks scale-free networks. Collaborating with his student, Réka Albert, he introduced the Barabási–Albert model, which proposed that growth and preferential attachment are jointly responsible for the emergence of the scale-free property in real-world networks. The following year, Barabási demonstrated that the power law degree distribution is not limited to the World Wide Web, but also appear in metabolic networks and protein–protein interaction networks, demonstrating the universality of the scale-free property. In 2009 Science, for the ten-year anniversary of the 1999 paper on scale-free networks, dedicated a special issue to Complex Systems and Networks.

=== Network robustness and resilience ===
In a 2001 paper with Réka Albert and Hawoong Jeong, Barabási demonstrated that networks exhibit robustness to random failures but are highly vulnerable to targeted attacks, a characteristic known as the Achilles' heel property. Specifically, networks can easily withstand the random failure of a large number of nodes, highlighting their significant robustness. However, they are prone to rapid collapse when the most connected hubs are deliberately removed. The breakdown threshold of a network was analytically linked to the second moment of the degree distribution, whose convergence to zero for large networks explain why heterogenous networks can survive the failure of a large fraction of their nodes. In 2016, Barabási extended these concepts to network resilience, demonstrating that the network structure determines a system's capacity for resilience. While robustness refers to the system's ability to carry out its basic functions despite the loss of some nodes and links, resilience involved the system's ability to adapt to internal and external disturbances by modifying its mode of operation without losing functionality. Therefore, resilience is a dynamical property that requires a fundamental shift in the system's core activities.

=== Network medicine ===
Barabási is recognized as one of the founders of network medicine, a term he introduced in his 2007 article entitled "Network Medicine – From Obesity to the "Diseasome"", published in The New England Journal of Medicine. His work established the concept of diseasome, or disease network, which illustrates how diseases are interconnected through shared genetic factors, highlighting their common genetic roots. He subsequently pioneered the use of large patient data, linking the roots of disease comorbidity to molecular networks. A key concept of network medicine is Barabási's discovery that genes associated with the same disease are located in the same network neighborhood, which led to the concept of disease module, which is currently employed to facilitate drug discovery, drug design, and the development of biomarkers. He elaborated on these concepts in his a 2012 TEDMED talk, emphasizing their significance in medical research and treatment strategies.

His contributions have been instrumental in establishing the Channing Division of Network Medicine at Harvard Medical School and the Network Medicine Institute, representing 33 universities and institutions around the world committed to advancing the field. Barabási's work in network medicine has led to multiple experimentally falsifiable predictions, helping identify experimentally validated novel pathways in asthma, the prediction of new mechanism of action for compounds such as rosmarinic acid, and the repurposing of existing drugs for new therapeutic functions.

The practical applications of network medicine have made significant impacts in clinical settings. For example, his research aids physicians in determining whether rheumatoid arthritis patients will respond to anti-TNF therapy. During COVID Barabási led a major collaboration involving researchers from Harvard University, Boston University and The Broad Institute, to predict and experimentally test the efficacy for COVID patients of 6,000 approved drugs.

=== Dark matter of nutrition and food complexity ===
In collaboration with Giulia Menichetti, Barabási has studied nutritional dark matter, food composition, and their implications for health. In his 2019 study, he revealed that conventional nutritional databases track only a minuscule fraction of the over 26,000 biochemicals present in food, coining the term "nutritional dark matter," work that inspired the Periodic Table of Food Initiative by the Rockefeller Foundation and the American Heart Association. In 2021, he extended network medicine approaches to elucidate the health implications of polyphenols, demonstrating how intricate molecular networks connect dietary compounds to health outcomes. His research on food processing led to the development of the first AI tool to predict the degree of food processing for any food, and showed that over 73% of the US food supply is ultra-processed and correlating processing levels with adverse health markers. Barabási's efforts culminated in the 2025 release of GroceryDB and the TrueFood database, that is used by millions on a daily basis, as it reveals the processing levels of foods in US supermarkets.

=== Human dynamics ===
Barabási in 2005 discovered the fat-tailed nature of the interevent times in human activity patterns. The pattern indicated that human activity is bursty - short periods of intensive activity are followed by long periods that lack detectable activity. Bursty patterns have been subsequently discovered in a wide range of processes, from web browsing to email communications and gene expression patterns. He proposed the Barabási model of human dynamics, to explain the phenomena, demonstrating that a queuing model can explain the bursty nature of human activity, a topic is covered by his book Bursts: The Hidden Pattern Behind Everything We Do.

=== Human mobility ===
Barabási laid foundational work in understanding individual human mobility patterns through a series of influential papers. In his 2008 Nature publication, Barabási utilized anonymized mobile phone data to analyze human mobility, discovering that human movement exhibits a high degree of regularity in time and space, with individuals showing consistent travel distances and a tendency to return to frequently visited locations. In a subsequent 2010 Science paper, he explored the predictability of human dynamics by analyzing mobile phone user trajectories. Contrary to expectations, he found a 93% predictability of in human movements across all users. He introduced two principles governing human trajectories, leading to the development of the widely used model for individual mobility. Using this modeling framework, a decade before the COVID-19 pandemic, Barabási predicted the spreading patterns of a virus transmitted through direct contact.

=== Network control ===
Barabási has made significant contributions to the understanding of network controllability and observability, addressing the fundamental question of how large networks regulate and manage their own behavior. He was the first to apply the tools of control theory to network science, bridging disciplines that had traditionally been studied separately. He proposed a method to identify the nodes through which one can control a complex network, by mapping the control problem, widely studied in physics and engineering since Maxwell, into graph matching, merging statistical mechanics and control theory.

Barabási utilized network control principles to predict the functions of individual neurons within the Caenorhabditis elegans connectome. This application provided direct experimental confirmation of network control theories by successfully identifying new neurons involved in the organism's locomotion, and experimentally confirming the validity of the predictions. His work demonstrated the practical utility of network control methods in biological systems, highlighting their potential for uncovering previously unknown functional components within complex networks.

== Awards ==
Barabási was the recipient of the 2024 Gothenburg Lise Meitner Award; he has also been the recipient of the 2023 Julius Edgar Lilienfeld Prize, a society-wide prize of the American Physical Society "for pioneering work on the statistical physics of networks that transformed the study of complex systems, and for lasting contributions in communicating the significance of this rapidly developing field to a broad range of audiences." In 2021 he received the EPS Statistical and Nonlinear Physics Prize, awarded by the European Physical Society for "his pioneering contributions to the development of complex network science, in particular for his seminal work on scale-free networks, the preferential attachment model, error and attack tolerance in complex networks, controllability of complex networks, the physics of social ties, communities, and human mobility patterns, genetic, metabolic, and biochemical networks, as well as applications in network biology and network medicine."

Barabási has been elected to the US National Academy of Sciences, Austrian Academy of Sciences (2024), Hungarian Academy of Sciences (2004), Academia Europaea (2007), European Academy of Sciences and Art (2018), Romanian Academy of Sciences (2018) and the Massachusetts Academy of Sciences (2013). He was elected Fellow of the American Physical Society (2003), of the American Association for the Advancement of Science (2011), of the Network Science Society (2021). He was awarded a Doctor Honoris Causa by Obuda University (2023) in Hungary, the Technical University of Madrid (2011), Utrecht University (2018) and West University of Timișoara (2020).

He received the Bolyai Prize from the Hungarian Academy of Sciences (2019), the Senior Scientific Award of the Complex Systems Society (2017) for "setting the basis of what is now modern Network Science", the Lagrange Prize (2011) C&C Prize (2008) Japan "for stimulating innovative research on networks and discovering that the scale-free property is a common feature of various real-world complex networks" and the Cozzarelli Prize, National Academies of Sciences (USA), John von Neumann Medal (2006) awarded by the John von Neumann Computer Society from Hungary, for outstanding achievements in computer-related science and technology and the FEBS Anniversary Prize for Systems Biology (2005).

In 2021, Barabási was ranked 2nd in the world in a ranking of the world's best engineering and technology scientists, based on their h-index.

== Selected publications ==
- Barabási, Albert-László, The Formula: The Universal Laws of Success, November 6, 2018; ISBN 0-316-50549-8 (hardcover)
- Barabási, Albert-László (2018). Network science. Cambridge University Press. ISBN 978-1-107-07626-6.
- Barabási, Albert-László, Bursts: The Hidden Pattern Behind Everything We Do, April 29, 2010; ISBN 0-525-95160-1 (hardcover)
- Barabási, Albert-László, Linked: The New Science of Networks, 2002. ISBN 0-452-28439-2 (pbk)
- Barabási, Albert-László and Réka Albert, "Emergence of scaling in random networks", Science, 286:509–512, October 15, 1999
- Barabási, Albert-László and Zoltán Oltvai, "Network Biology", Nature Reviews Genetics 5, 101–113 (2004)
- Barabási, Albert-László, Mark Newman and Duncan J. Watts, The Structure and Dynamics of Networks, 2006; ISBN 0-691-11357-2
- Barabási, Albert-László, Natali Gulbahce, and Joseph Loscalzo, "Network Medicine", Nature Reviews Genetics 12, 56–68 (2011)
- Réka Albert, Hawoong Jeong & Barabási, Albert-László (1999). "The Diameter of the WWW". Nature. 401 (6749): 130–31. arXiv:cond-mat/9907038. Bibcode:1999Natur.401..130A. doi:10.1038/43601. S2CID 4419938.
- Y.-Y. Liu, J.-J. Slotine, A.-L. Barabási, "Controllability of complex networks", Nature 473, 167–173 (2011)
- Y.-Y. Liu, J.-J. Slotine, A.-L. Barabási, "Observability of complex systems", Proceedings of the National Academy of Sciences 110, 1–6 (2013)
- Baruch Barzel and A.-L. Barabási, "Universality in Network Dynamics", Nature Physics 9, 673–681 (2013)
- Baruch Barzel and A.-L. Barabási, "Network link prediction by global silencing of indirect correlations", Nature Biotechnology 31, 720–725 (2013)
- B. Barzel Y.-Y. Liu and A.-L. Barabási, "Constructing minimal models for complex system dynamics", Nature Communications 6, 7186 (2015).
- J. Gao, B. Barzel, A.-L, Barabási, "Universal resilience patterns in complex networks". Nature 530(7590):307-12 (2016).
