= Delmar Divide =

Socioeconomic and racial divide along Delmar Boulevard in St. Louis, Missouri

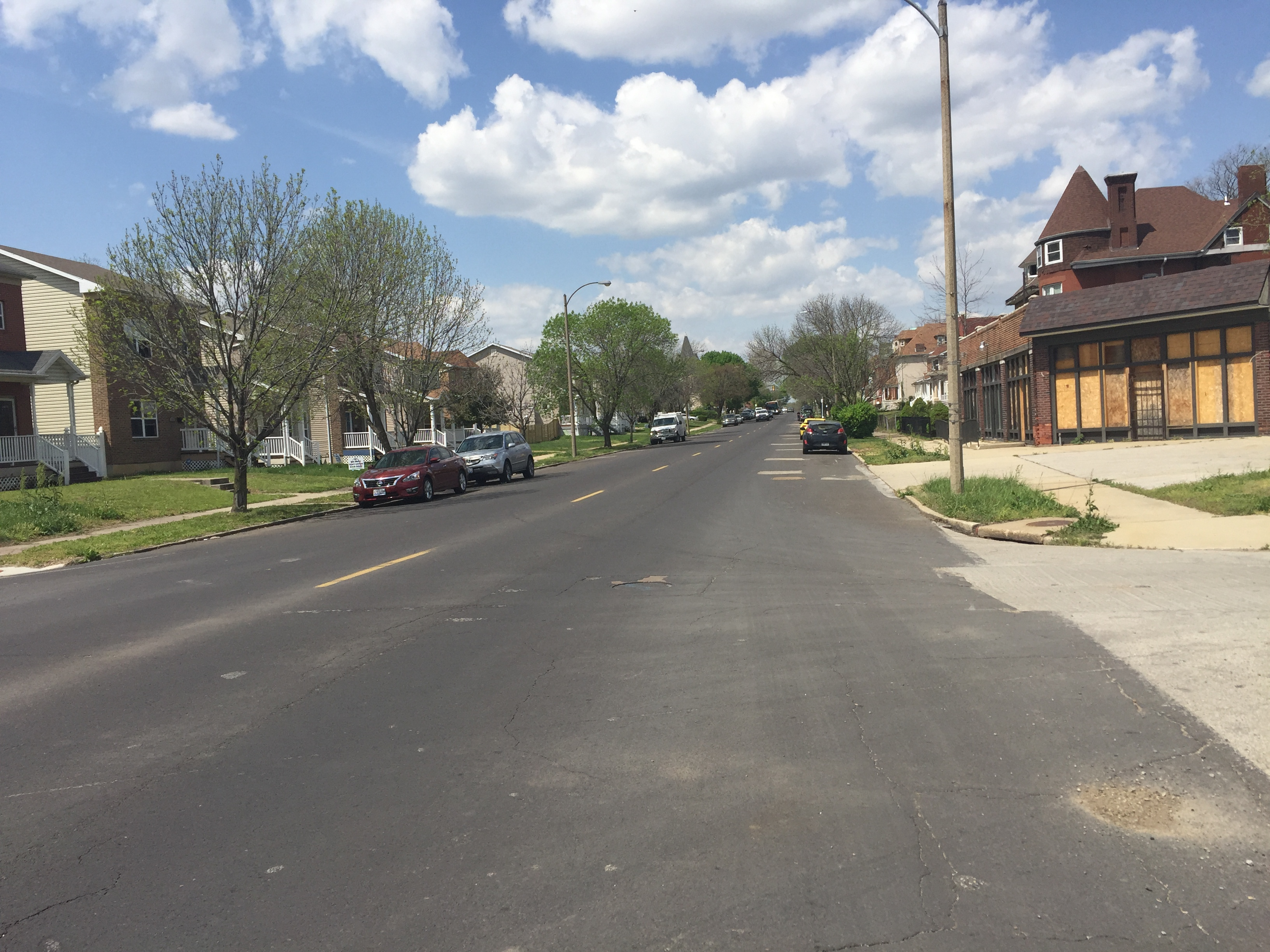
Delmar Boulevard. Left is south of Delmar Boulevard, and right is north of Delmar Boulevard.

The Delmar Divide refers to Delmar Boulevard as a socioeconomic and racial dividing line in St. Louis, Missouri. The term was popularized outside Greater St. Louis by a four-minute documentary from the BBC. Delmar Blvd. is an east–west street with its western terminus in the municipality of Olivette, Missouri extending into the City of St. Louis. There is a dense concentration of eclectic commerce on Delmar Blvd. near the municipal borders of University City and St. Louis. This area is known as the Delmar Loop. Delmar Blvd. is referred to as a "divide" in reference to the dramatic difference in racial populations in the neighborhoods to its immediate north and south: as of 2012, residents south of Delmar are 73% white, while residents north of Delmar are 98% black, and because of corresponding distinct socioeconomic, cultural, and public policy differences.

== History of segregation in St. Louis ==
The history of segregation in St. Louis is deeply rooted in systemic practices and policies that reinforced racial divisions. In 1916, during the Jim Crow Era, St. Louis passed a residential segregation ordinance designed to maintain racial homogeneity in neighborhoods. This ordinance stated that if 75% of the residents in a neighborhood were of a particular race, no individual from a different race could move into the area. Although this law was challenged and overturned by the NAACP in court, its legacy continues through other discriminatory practices.

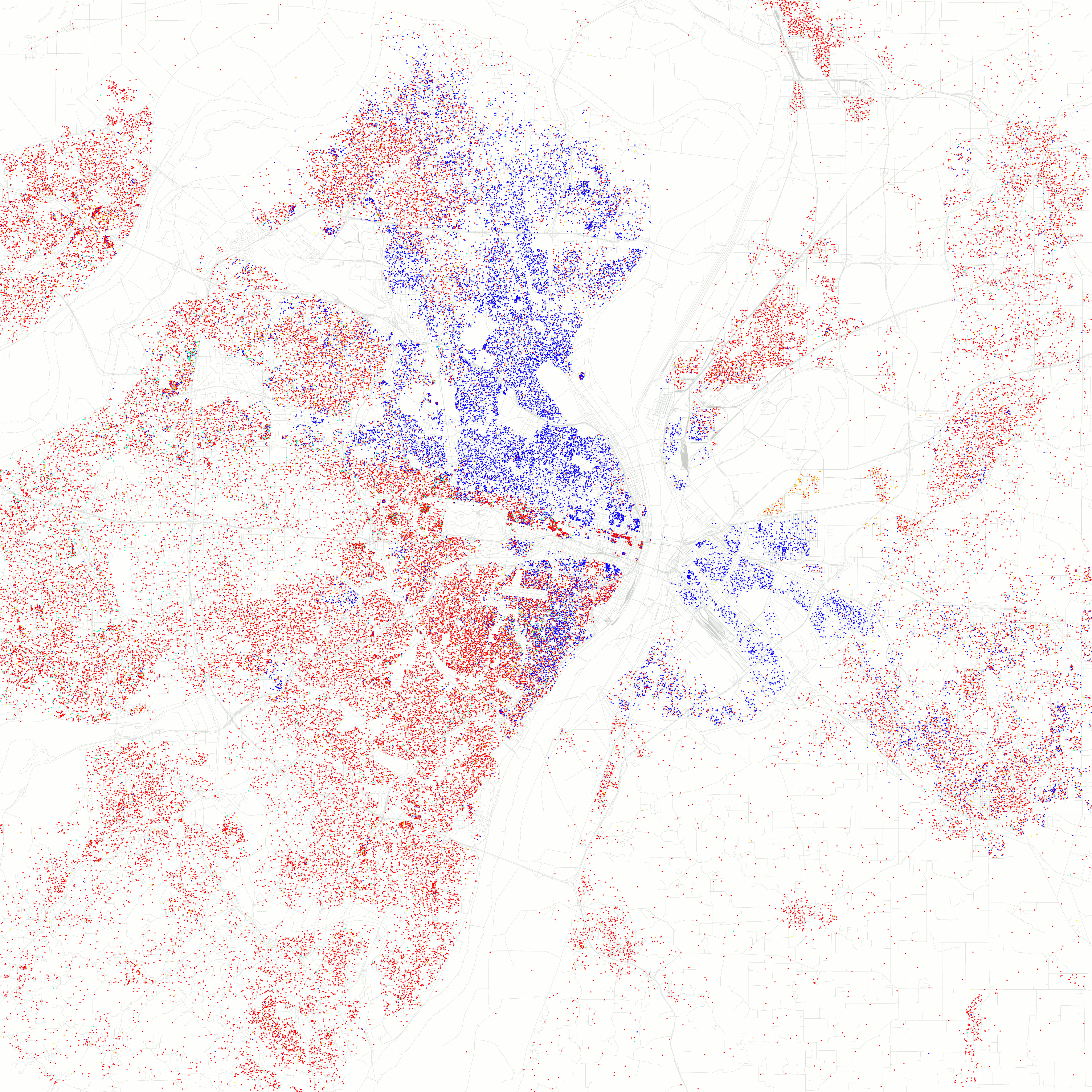
Map of racial distribution in St. Louis, 2010 U.S. Census. Each dot is 25 people: ⬤ White ⬤ Black ⬤ Asian ⬤ Hispanic ⬤ Other

As a result of the ordinance's failure, racial covenants were widely adopted. These legal agreements prevented the sale of properties in specific neighborhoods to individuals who were not white. These covenants were enforced through social and economic pressure and were legally binding until the Supreme Court ruled them unconstitutional in the landmark Shelley v. Kraemer case of 1948. This ruling, although it was significant, did not immediately combat segregation, and housing discrimination persisted through informal practices.

During this time, The Ville, a neighborhood located several blocks north of Delmar Boulevard, emerged as a central hub for the Black middle class. Many Black professionals, educators, and entrepreneurs were forbidden from living in other areas of the city so they made The Ville their home. The neighborhood became a thriving cultural and economic center, hosting institutions like Sumner High School, one of the first high schools for African Americans west of the Mississippi River.

Urban renewal initiatives worsened racial and socioeconomic divides. In 1954, the city of St. Louis passed an ordinance to redevelop the Mill Creek Valley, a predominantly Black community located south of Delmar Boulevard. The redevelopment, which started in 1959, displaced over 20,000 residents and destroyed the community to make room for projects like Saint Louis University expansions, Highway 40, LaClede Town, and Grand Towers. Most displaced residents were forced to relocate to The Ville or areas north of Delmar, which made overcrowding and resource scarcity worse.

To address the housing needs of displaced populations, the St. Louis Housing Authority expanded public housing developments north of Delmar Boulevard throughout the mid-20th century. However, these projects such as Pruitt-Igoe, were underfunded, had poor maintenance, and social stigma. By the 2000s, public housing in these areas had reinforced the image of Delmar Boulevard as a dividing line between wealth and poverty, further solidifying its role as a racial and socioeconomic boundary.

== Statistics and studies ==
As estimated by the U.S. Census Bureau, in 2014 the populations separated by Delmar Blvd. were as follows.

	Racial majority	Median home value	Median income	Percentage of residents with bachelor's degrees
Neighborhood directly north of Delmar Blvd	99% Black	$73,000	$18,000	10%
Neighborhood directly south of Delmar Blvd	73% White	$335,000	$50,000	70%

The Delmar Divide illustrates segregation issues in St. Louis more broadly. Segregation in St. Louis, Missouri has been the subject of many studies. A Manhattan Institute study entitled “The End of the Segregated Century: Racial Separation in America's Neighborhoods, 1890-2010” studied segregation in U.S. cities with the largest population of black residents. The study ranked each city by a dissimilarity index and an isolation index. The dissimilarity index measures the extent to which different racial groups are found to live in equal proportion in each neighborhood in a city. The higher the number, the higher a percentage of a racial group would need to move to a different neighborhood to achieve equality. The isolation index measures neighborhoods that have extremely different racial makeups. In 2010, St. Louis ranked 14th in African American population, with a dissimilarity index of 71.0 (the fifth-highest score in major cities in the US) and an isolation index of 53.8 (the 6th highest score in major cities in the US). This study found St. Louis to be one of the most segregated cities in the U.S.

A study done by Washington University in St. Louis and Saint Louis University found the higher number of African American residents in a community is correlated with higher rates of poverty. This study, titled "Segregation in St. Louis: Dismantling the Divide", also notes that Saint Louis "ranks 42nd out of 50 large metro areas" when assessing a child's probability to climb up the social and income hierarchy (that is, economic ascension from lowest 1/5th of population to highest 1/5th by the time of adulthood). Moreover, it points out that the "average annual inflation rate" for home equity was "-0.4%" for households with Black residents, compared to positive increases for other households.

In addition, this racial segregation data is viewable in one study collecting the 2010 census data into an interactive map showing one dot for each person recorded, color-coded by race.

== Gentrification along the Delmar Divide ==
Starting in the early 1900s, St. Louis was one of few cities that actively pushed for legalizing local zoning. In Mapping Decline, author Colin Gordon notes that the fear of a "negro invasion", orchestrated by local realtors, led to the formation of a “new organization...that called for racial zoning, provoked practices of school segregation, and overall advocated for 'mutual restriction' between the two primary races". This lay the foundation that has impacted St. Louis ever since.

In the 1970s, rapid urban renewal expanded upon the underlying foundation of gentrification. According to Gordon, the short-term focus of this renewal was "attracting high-income residents back downtown and eradicating the 'worst slums'" of the city, the majority of which were in the northern parts of the city. These efforts of urbanization ultimately failed, however, and left the regions “blighted” and considered by earlier advocates of development to be :an economic liability".

Gordon goes on to mention that many of such developmental failures lie primarily in the northern section of St. Louis, one cause of the divide along the northern and southern regions of Delmar.

By the late 1990s, the leading minority loan-lender banks in the city, Boatmen's, was in danger of dismantling. In 1993, as part of the Community Reinvestment Act (CRA), Boatmen's Bank announce it would provide $284 million per year to all borrowers in all communities. In the following years, Boatmen's received consecutive awards for its service to minorities in St. Louis. But, after acquiring Boatmen's in 1996, NationsBank dismantled the many minority-lending programs, which largely remain unavailable, particularly in the region north of Delmar.

As Ian Trivers finds, "despite the prime location and low cost housing...the neighborhoods directly north of the prosperous CWE [the Central West End, south of the Delmar Divide] have experienced almost no redevelopment and repopulation spillover". Trivers goes on to say that neighborhoods north of Delmar are still recovering from the brunt past; physical violence increased and "vacant buildings" and "empty lots are common sights" on the north side of Delmar.

== Income-level disparity Along the Divide ==
A 2014 joint report issued by Washington University in St. Louis and Saint Louis University, titled “Segregation in St. Louis,” investigates the wealth gap between black and white families along the Delmar Divide. The report notes the “average African-American family takes 228 years to amass the same amount of wealth as the average white family”. Additionally, the same study reports that the wealth return generated by education between Black and White families differ by as much as $50,000. In “Black Lives and Policing: The Larger Context of Ghettoization,” author John Logan depicts that while poverty in the suburbs of St. Louis is “below 12%,” Ferguson “tracts in the range of 20-25% poor” with some even above “35% poor”. In “What Do We Mean When We Say, ‘Structural Racism,’” author Walter Johnson writes that “federal housing assistance” in the city are often placed under a “segregated housing market,” ultimately causing many blacks to be illegally excluded. As J. Rosie Tighe states in “The Divergent City: Unequal and Uneven Development in St. Louis,” the region's clear divide along the Delmar into the north and south means that “lower income households and people of color … are disproportionately concentrated … and suffer disproportionality from the resulting misdistribution”.

== Education inequalities ==
Education inequities along the Delmar Divide are a significant driver of the socioeconomic disparities between the neighborhoods north and south off Delmar Boulevard. Schools in neighborhoods north of Delmar face chronic underfunding due to reliance on property taxes to fund education. As property values north of Delmar are significantly lower than those to the south, schools in these areas struggle to secure adequate resources to support students. According to Segregation in St. Louis: Dismantling the Divide, the lack of funding has an influential effect on the quality of education, leading to fewer advanced placement courses, limited extracurricular activities, and an overall disconnection from the broader economy.

These inequalities are not just a matter of financial disparity but also have long-term consequences for students' futures. Data from the report highlight that educational achievement in neighborhoods north of Delmar is significantly lower than in the south, with only 10% of residents holding a bachelor's degree compared to 70% in the south as seen in the table above. This disparity perpetuates cycles of poverty and prevents upward mobility, as students from underfunded schools face more significant challenges accessing higher education and landing well-paying jobs. Addressing these inequities requires systemic reforms, including restructured funding models and targeted investments in schools north of Delmar to make sure that all students have access to quality education.

== Health inequities ==
St. Louis's historical health disparities continue to influence the health outcomes of its residents, particularly Black communities. Central to this issue is St. Louis Children's Hospital (SLCH), which has a history of segregated medical care. SLCH, located on the south side of Delmar Boulevard, initially operated as a whites-only institution when it opened in 1879. By 1915, as it grew in prominence, it reverted to a segregated model due to discomfort from white patients being treated alongside Black patients. Although integration officially began in 1942 within SLCH, it took another 22 years for the adult hospitals to fully integrate, following the 1964 Civil Rights Act. However, the trauma of this segregation continues to impact both patients and hospital staff, maintaining distrust in the healthcare system.

The Delmar Divide remains a factor in health inequities, with a significant difference in healthcare access and outcomes between communities north and south of Delmar Boulevard. The divide correlates strongly with unequal access to healthcare resources, such as primary care physicians, specialized medical services, and even basic necessities like nutritious food. The effects are especially evident in maternal and infant health outcomes: Black babies in St. Louis die at nearly “three times the rate of their white counterparts (13.5 vs. 4.4 deaths per 1,000 live births)”. Additionally, there is an 18-year gap in life expectancy at birth between the areas in north and south St. Louis. This reflects the cumulative effects of historical segregation, ongoing systemic racism, and the lack of investment in marginalized communities.

Access to healthcare in North St. Louis County and other low-income, predominantly Black neighborhoods is also constrained by structural barriers. A 2016 study highlighted challenges faced by residents, including a lack of nearby medical facilities, provider shortages, and limited access to transportation. Residents often need to travel long distances to reach clinics or hospitals, which can be particularly difficult for those relying on public transit. This logistical hurdle disproportionately affects vulnerable populations, including children in the Normandy School District. Many students in this district face chronic health issues such as asthma, allergies, and behavioral health disorders, yet they struggle to access necessary medical care due to long commutes and appointment delays. Moreover, despite the availability of Medicaid, patients face challenges in obtaining specialized care.

Environmental factors further compound these health inequities. Neighborhoods north of Delmar are disproportionately affected by industrial pollution, poor housing conditions, and limited green spaces, all of which contribute to higher rates of respiratory illnesses and cardiovascular diseases.

== Intersection of policy and race ==
Federal housing policies from the mid-20th century contributed to racial segregation in the Delmar Boulevard area. In 1935, the Home Owner's Loan Corporation (HOLC) developed redlining maps to assess the risk associated with mortgage lending in various urban areas, often determined by racial and socioeconomic factors. Areas north of Delmar Boulevard in St. Louis were classified as "hazardous" and outlined in red due to their predominantly Black population, even if Black families were middle class and above. This designation discouraged mortgage lending and investment in these neighborhoods, leading to decades of disinvestment, declining property values, and limited economic disparities that refine the Delmar Divide today.

The policies of the Federal Housing Administration (FHA) and the Veterans Administration during the mid-20th century significantly contributed to the economic and racial disparities seen along the Delmar Divide. From 1934 to 1962, the vast majority of federally insured home loans—approximately 98%—were granted to white borrowers, systemically excluding nonwhite populations. This discriminatory practice not only denied Black families access to homeownership but also deepened the effects of redlining by depriving neighborhoods north of Delmar Boulevard of the resources needed for property maintenance and generational wealth transfer. By the time the Fair Housing Act of 1968 sought to end these explicit forms of housing discrimination, many homes in these areas had fallen into severe disrepair. Decades of neglect forced numerous residents to abandon their properties and move elsewhere, often to suburban neighborhoods. These policies played a central role in creating and perpetuating the clear divide in wealth and opportunity that characterizes Delmar Boulevard today.

== Grassroots movements and community resilience ==
Efforts by local organizations have played a significant role in addressing the socio-economic disparities along the Delmar Divide. These initiatives have focused on empowering communities and promoting equitable development.

=== Community Development Administration (CDA) Initiatives ===
The Community Development Administration (CDA) of St. Louis, launched in 2024, has been instrumental in funding projects aimed at neighborhood revitalization through their Neighborhood Transformation Grants. These grants have supported initiatives such as affordable housing, small business development, and public safety improvements, contributing to the overall betterment of communities north of Delmar Boulevard.

=== St. Louis Vacancy Collaborative (SLVC) ===
The St. Louis Vacancy Collaborative (SLVC) addresses the issue of vacant properties and their impact on neighborhoods. By converting abandoned spaces into community assets, the SLVC promotes urban gardening, creates affordable housing, and organizes community clean-up events, thereby enhancing community involvement and revitalization efforts. They have issued a two-year-long partnership starting in 2023 and expected to be completed by 2025, to implement changes to vacant lots for community-wide outreach.

=== St. Louis Association of Community Organizations (SLACO) ===
The St. Louis Association of Community Organizations (SLACO) represents a coalition of neighborhood associations that work towards promoting racial equity and improving the quality of life in St. Louis. Starting in the late 1970s, SLACO served specific metropolitan communities and expanded in 2014 to other regions, promoting community involvement and advocating for racial equality. SLACO's projects include advocating for fair housing policies, organizing neighborhood watch programs, and providing resources for youth development, which collectively aim to foster greater community engagement and address systemic inequities.
