= Effective complexity =

Effective complexity is a measure of complexity defined in a 1996 paper by Murray Gell-Mann and Seth Lloyd that attempts to measure the amount of non-random information in a system. It has been criticised as being dependent on the subjective decisions made as to which parts of the information in the system are to be discounted as random.

== See also ==
- Kolmogorov complexity
- Excess entropy
- Logical depth
- Renyi information
- Self-dissimilarity
- Forecasting complexity
