= Itamar Procaccia =

Israeli physicist and chemist (born 1949)

- איתמר פרוקצ'יה
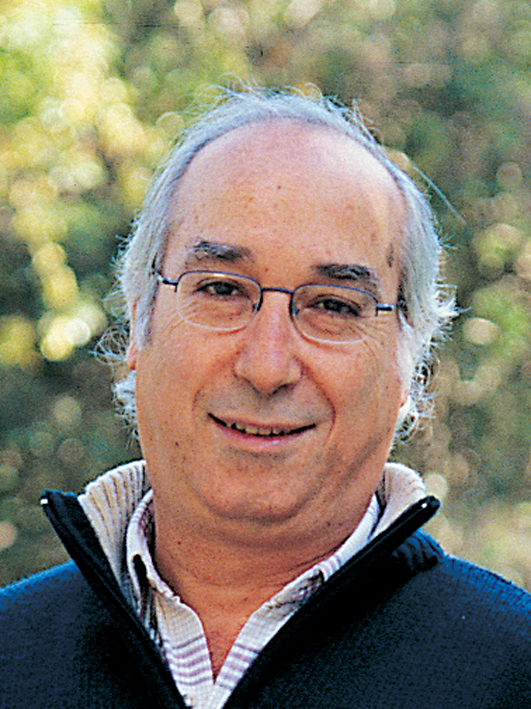
- Born: October 29, 1949 Tel Aviv, Israel
- Citizenship: Israeli
- Education: Hebrew University of Jerusalem (B.Sc. and Ph.D.)
- Awards: Weizmann Prize (2005), Israel Prize (2009), EPS Statistical and Nonlinear Physics Prizes (2017)
- Scientific career
- Fields: Statistical physics, nonlinear dynamics, turbulence
- Institutions: Weizmann Institute

Itamar Procaccia (Hebrew: איתמר פרוקצ'יה; born September 29, 1949, in Tel Aviv) is an Israeli physicist and chemist who has made contributions to areas in statistical physics, nonlinear dynamics, soft matter, and turbulence.

Procaccia studied chemistry at the Hebrew University in Jerusalem with and obtained a bachelor's degree in 1973 and obtained a doctorate in theoretical chemistry in 1976. From 1977 to 1979, he was a postdoctoral fellow at the Massachusetts Institute of Technology. Since 1979 he has been at the Weizmann Institute, where he became a professor in 1985.

With Peter Grassberger, he introduced the correlation dimension as a measure of fractal dimension in 1983 (often referred to as the Grassberger–Procaccia algorithm).

He has held guest appointments at the City University of New York, the Institut des Hautes Études Scientifiques, Nordita, the Isaac Newton Institute, Rockefeller University, the École normale supérieure de Lyon, and the University of Chicago, among others.

He is a fellow of the American Physical Society, the Institute of Physics and a member of the Leopoldina and the Royal Danish Academy of Sciences and Letters. In 2009 he received the Israel Prize for physics. In 2017 he received the EPS Statistical and Nonlinear Physics Prize.

== Selected publications ==
- Peter Grassberger, Itamar Procaccia Measuring the Strangeness of Strange Attractors, Physica D, 9, (1983), 189–208
- Peter Grassberger, Itamar Procaccia Characterization of strange attractors, Physical Review Letters, 50, (1983), 346–349
- Thomas C. Halsey, Mogens H. Jensen, Leo P. Kadanoff, Itamar Procaccia, and Boris I. Shraiman "Fractal measures and their singularities: The characterization of strange sets", Physics A, 33 1141 (1986)
