= Duncan Segregation Index =

Measure of gender in the labor force

The Duncan Segregation Index is a measure of occupational segregation based on gender that measures whether there is a larger than expected presence of one gender over another in a given occupation or labor force by identifying the percentage of employed women (or men) who would have to change occupations for the occupational distribution of men and women to be equal. A Duncan Segregation Index value of 0 occurs when the share of women in every occupation is the same as women's share of employment as a whole. In other words, 0 indicates perfect gender integration within the workforce, while a value of 1 indicates complete gender segregation within the workforce.

== Origin ==
In 1955, Otis Dudley Duncan, a professor at the University of Chicago at the time, and Beverly Duncan published "A Methodological Analysis of Segregation Indices," in the American Sociological Review. The Article investigated many different potential measurements of segregation and concluded that the Index of Dissimilarity, also known as the Duncan Segregation Index, was the best measure of occupational segregation. Given the Duncan Segregation Index's clear properties and use of only male and female populations, Duncan and Duncan concluded that the index of dissimilarity was the easiest measure of segregation to calculate.

== Calculation ==
The Duncan Segregation index is an example of an index of dissimilarity and is calculated using the following formula:

$\frac{1}{2} \sum_{i=1}^N \left| \frac{m_i}{M} - \frac{f_i}{F} \right|$

m_{i} = the male population of the i^{th} occupation
M = the total male population of the country or labor force of interest.
f_{i} = the female population of the i^{th} occupation
F = the total female population of the country or labor force of interest.

== Theories Behind Occupational Segregation ==
Historically, men and women have worked in separate sectors of the economy. Women are associated with pink-collar jobs, while men are associated with blue/white-collar jobs, making it difficult for women to transcend across those job categories. Employment stereotypes have made it difficult for men and women to work particular jobs, as there is still a strong social belief that men belong in certain employment areas, while women belong in others.

A second theory states that men and women have different tastes for different jobs. This theory proposes the idea that women are more likely to choose family-oriented jobs because that is what women are naturally inclined towards. This theory is highly controversial as women are associated with staying at home, working child/sibling care jobs, and partaking in other home related activities.

A third theory deals with employer's attitudes to workers. Some employers view women as weak, emotional, and submissive, while they view men as aggressive, decisive, and strong. Thus, they see the sexes as suited for different types of work.

== Examples ==
Occupational segregation by gender in the United States declined rapidly from 0.65 in 1970 to 0.54 in 1990. Little progress has been made since 2000. These declines were primarily due to women entering formerly predominantly male occupations. Despite this decline, labor force gender segregation is still evident in today's labor market.

Duncan Segregation Index in various jobs within the United States (numbers range on a scale from 0 to 1, where 0 = perfect equality and 1= perfect inequality)

Male Dominance:

Roofers: 0.97

Lawyers: 0.33

Taxi drivers: 0.77

Athletes: 0.60

Physicians: 0.36

Women Dominance:

Nurses: 0.82

Social Workers: 0.39

Hairdressers: 0.78

Legal Assistants: 0.68

Statistics from University of North Texas

== Trends in the United States ==
Altogether, the Duncan Index of dissimilarity has decreased in the United States over the past four decades. This is true for both college graduates, as well as non-college educated people. People who have completed at least four years of college experience less sex segregation than those who have not. However, the rate of decrease of segregation is similar for all education levels.

In the US, women are underrepresented in fields including technical operation, engineering, and craft. Conversely, women make up the majority of workers in fields like childcare, health related occupations, and education. In the aforementioned occupations, there has been little change in the index of dissimilarity in the time period between 1972 and 2012. Over the course of those four decades, these occupations have remained consistently and highly segregated.

On the other hand, several occupations such as bus drivers, pharmacists, and photographers have seen significant reduction in their segregation over the past four decades, with an index of dissimilarity approaching 0 over time. Other occupations like physicians, lawyers, and mail carriers have also seen reduced segregation, but have not yet come near a segregation index of 0. Altogether, certain occupations that are still seen as traditionally male or female have not seen any significant change in occupational segregation.

== Trends Internationally ==
While the Duncan Index of dissimilarity is primarily used to analyze segregation within the US, it has been adopted by other countries to measure gender segregation within the workplace as well.

For example, a report released by the European Commission's Expert Group on Gender and Employment used the Duncan Segregation Index and the Karmel and Maclachlan Index to monitor and compare trends of gender- based, occupational segregation across 27 European Union member states, Norway, Iceland and Liechtenstein. Studies followed both the occupational and sectoral areas of the labor market from the year 1997 to 2007.

Overall, the studies found minimal change in the high level of gender- based segregation in the workplace and that if anything, countries have experienced a slight increase. It is such a small shift however, around a 1% increase, that these findings are not necessarily cause for concern. Results show that the top four countries within the study that display the highest segregation rates are Estonia, Slovakia, Latvia and Finland. On the other hand, the countries with the lowest segregation rates turned out to be Greece, Romania, Malta and Italy.

Gender- based segregation quantified using the Duncan Segregation Index:

	1997 (occupational)	2007 (occupational)	1997 (sectoral)	2007 (sectoral)
Estonia	.618	.643	.435	.522
Slovakia	.630	.614	.429	.470
Latvia	.539	.603	.322	.470
Finland	.599	.592	.440	.460
Malta	N/A	.535	N/A	.339
Italy	.466	.494	.322	.372
România	.431	.472	.294	.324
Greece	.453	.468	.320	.334

General causes for international trends of gender- based, occupational segregation are noted as education, hours of work based on family commitment, gender stereotypes and implicit barriers that make upward job mobility difficult. These reasons align with previously mentioned theories regarding the Duncan Segregation Index.

== Mommy Track ==
“Mommy Track” is the path where a woman prioritizes taking care of her children over focusing on her career. Children can hold a woman back from advancing in the workplace, thus contributing to workplace inequality among women. Going on maternity leave often results in receiving less work, as well as dead assignments from their employers once they return, negatively affecting women's experience in the labor market. Women are not able to dedicate as much time to their career as men are, leaving them victim to wage discrimination, and therefore, more segregation in the labor market. For example, compared to men, married women have a 12% lower probably to obtain a tenure track. Many women believe the Mommy Track negatively affects their career, so they avoid having children, or they limit the extent of their child rearing. Many women also do not receive cash benefits for maternity leave. The U.S., Oman, and Papua New Guinea are three countries that do not provide financial support for maternity leave.
