= Racial integration =

Process of ending racial segregation

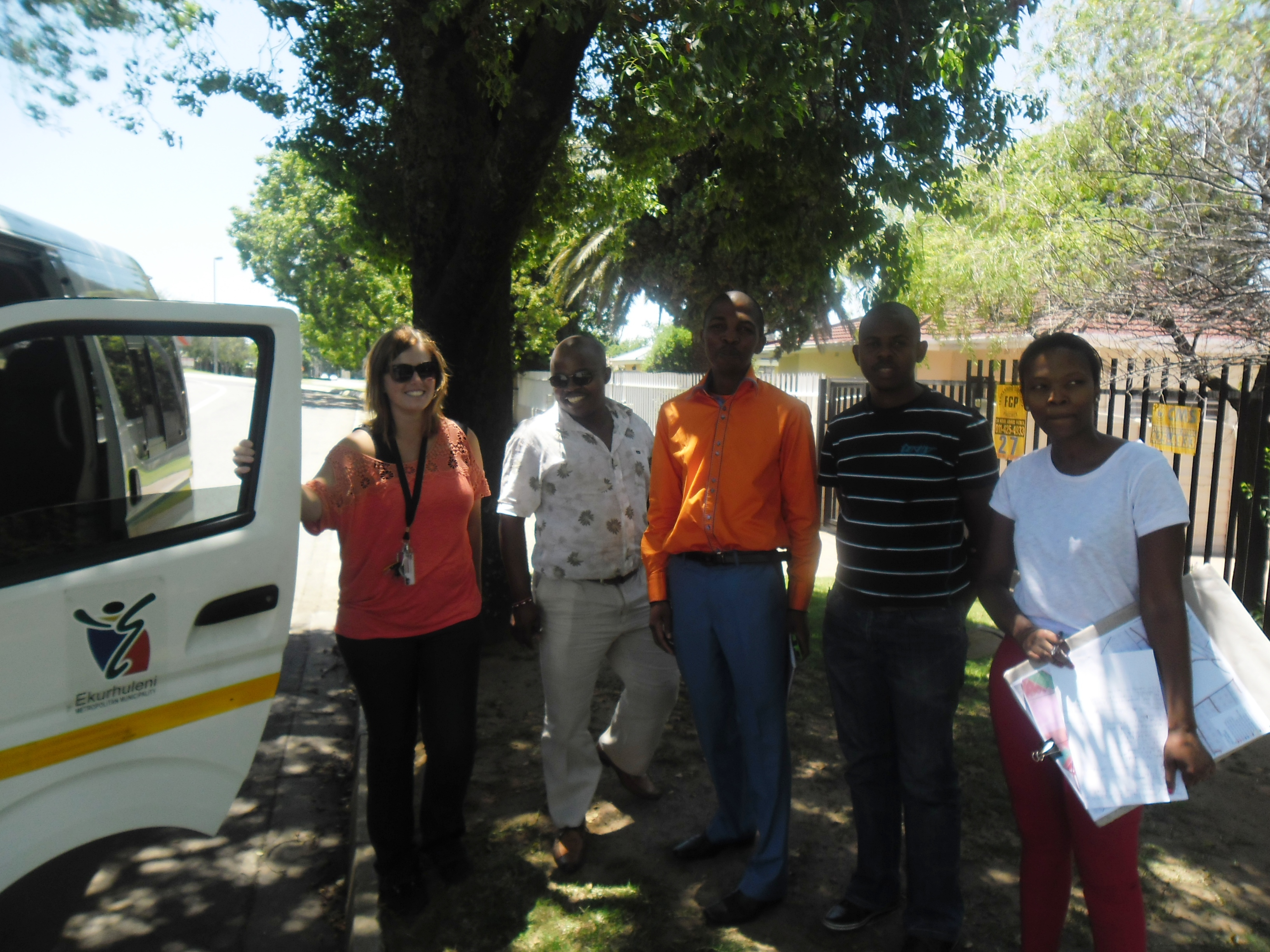
Planners from the Ekurhuleni Town Planning department on a routine site visit in Benoni. The team's composition is a reflection of the New South Africa racial integration policies.

Racial integration, or simply integration, includes desegregation (the process of ending systematic racial segregation), leveling barriers to association, creating equal opportunity regardless of race, and the development of a culture that draws on diverse traditions, rather than merely bringing a racial minority into the majority culture. Desegregation is largely a legal matter, integration largely a social one.

== Distinguishing integration from desegregation ==
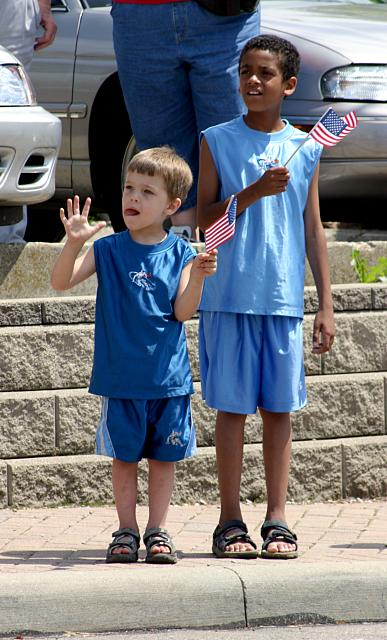
A white child and black child together at a parade in North College Hill, Ohio, US

Morris J. MacGregor Jr. in his paper "Integration of the Armed Forces 1940–1969", writes concerning the words integration and desegregation:

In recent years many historians have come to distinguish between these like-sounding words... The movement toward desegregation, breaking down the nation's Jim Crow system, became increasingly popular in the decade after World War II. Integration, on the other hand, Professor Oscar Handlin maintains, implies several things not yet necessarily accepted in all areas of American society. In one sense it refers to the "levelling of all barriers to association other than those based on ability, taste, and personal preference"; in other words, providing equal opportunity. But in another sense integration calls for the random distribution of a minority throughout society. Here, according to Handlin, the emphasis is on racial balance in areas of occupation, education, residency, and the like.

From the beginning the military establishment rightly understood that the breakup of the all-black unit would in a closed society necessarily mean more than mere desegregation. It constantly used the terms integration and equal treatment and opportunity to describe its racial goals. Rarely, if ever, does one find the word desegregation in military files that include much correspondence.

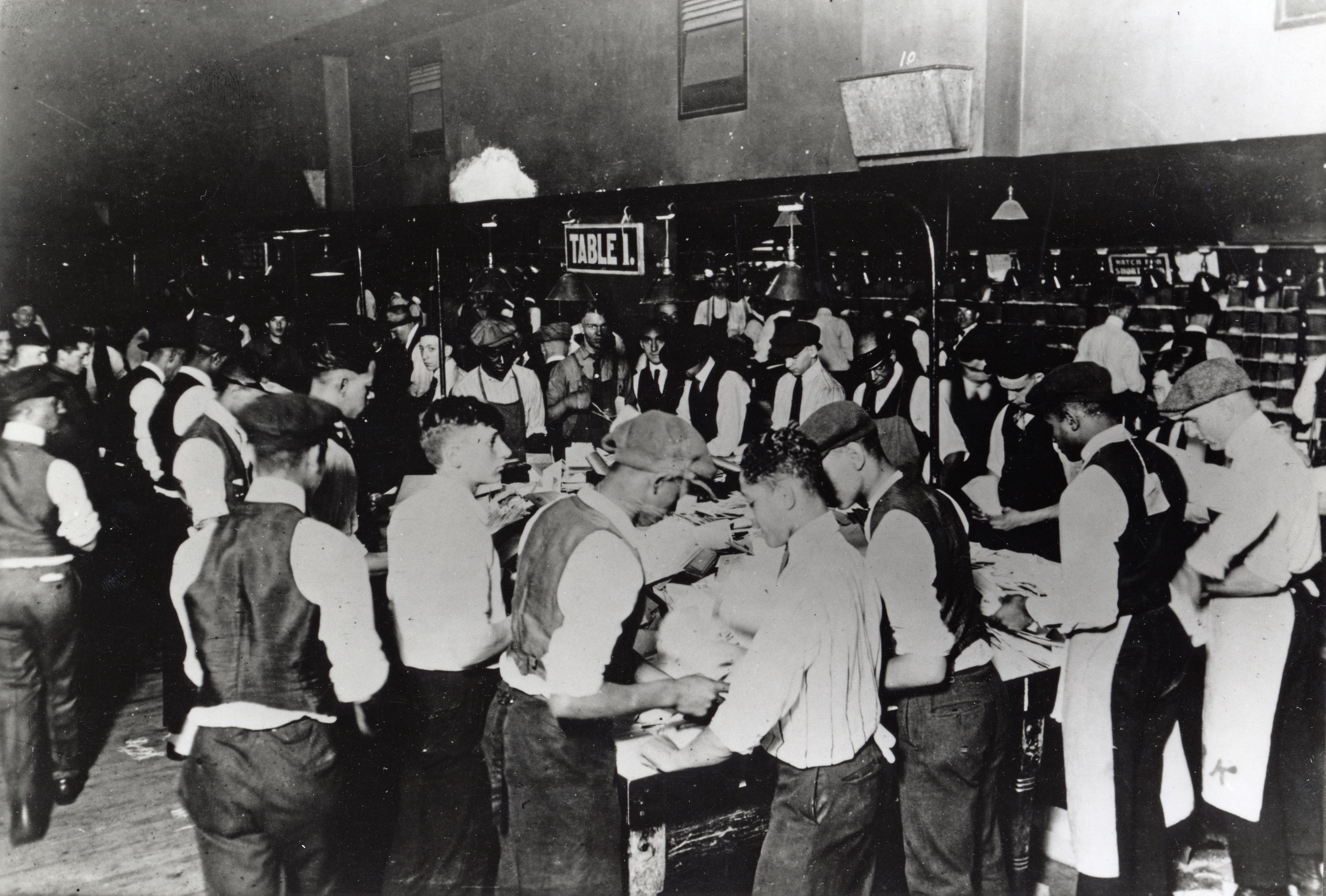
White and black postal clerks sorting mail together, US, 1890

Similarly, Keith M. Woods writes on the need for precision in journalistic language: "Integration happens when a monolith is changed, like when a black family moves into an all-white neighborhood. Integration happens even without a mandate from the law. Desegregation," on the other hand, "was the legal remedy to segregation." In 1997, Henry Organ, who identified himself as "a participant in the Civil Rights Movement on the (San Francisco) Peninsula in the '60s ... and ... an African American," wrote that the "term 'desegregation' is normally reserved to the legal/legislative domain, and it was the legalization of discrimination in public institutions based on race that many fought against in the 1960s. The term 'integration,' on the other hand, pertains to a social domain; it does and should refer to individuals of different background who opt to interact."

In their book By the Color of Our Skin (1999) Leonard Steinhorn and Barbara Diggs-Brown also make a similar distinction between desegregation and integration. They write "... television has ... give[n] white Americans the sensation of having meaningful, repeated contact with blacks without actually having it. We call this phenomenon virtual integration, and it is the primary reason why the integration illusion – the belief that we are moving toward a colorblind nation – has such a powerful influence on race relations in America today." Reviewing this book in the libertarian magazine Reason, Michael W. Lynch sums up some of their conclusions as "Blacks and whites live, learn, work, pray, play, and entertain separately..." Then, he writes:

The problem, as I see it, is that access to the public spheres, specifically the commercial sphere, often depends on being comfortable with the norms of white society. If a significant number of black children aren't comfortable with them, it isn't by choice: It's because they were isolated from those norms. It's one thing for members of the black elite and upper middle class to choose to retire to predominantly black neighborhoods after a lucrative day's work in white America. It's quite another for people to be unable to enter that commercial sphere because they spent their formative years in a community that didn't, or couldn't, prepare them for it. Writes [Harvard University sociologist Orlando] Patterson, "The greatest problem now facing African-Americans is their isolation from the tacit norms of the dominant culture, and this is true of all classes."

=== Distinction not universally accepted ===
Although widespread, the distinction between integration and desegregation is not universally accepted. For example, it is possible to find references to "court-ordered integration" from sources such as the Detroit News, PBS, or even Encarta. These same sources also use the phrase "court-ordered desegregation", apparently with exactly the same meaning; the Detroit News uses both expressions interchangeably in the same article.

When the two terms are confused, it is almost always to use integration in the narrower, more legalistic sense of desegregation; one rarely, if ever, sees desegregation used in the broader cultural sense.

== See also ==
- Civil rights movement
- Office of Fair Housing and Equal Opportunity
- Auto-segregation
- Intercultural Garden
- Online segregation
- Anti-discrimination law
- Blaxit
- Desegregation in the United States
