= Linked: The New Science of Networks =

- Author: Albert-László Barabási
- Language: English
- Genre: Popular science
- Publisher: Perseus Books Group
- Publication date: May 14, 2002
- Publication place: United States
- Media type: Print (Hardcover)
- Pages: 280
- ISBN: 0738206679
- Followed by: Bursts (2010)

Linked: The New Science of Networks is a popular science book written by the Hungarian physicist Albert-László Barabási and first published by the Perseus Books Group in 2002.

Barabási has changed the way of thinking about real-world networks and largely contributed to making networks the revolutionary science of the 21st century. Linked is his first book that introduces the highly developed field of network science to a broad audience. Linked has become a bestseller with more than 70,000 copies sold after fourteen printings and it was selected as one of the Best Business Books in 2002.

== Synopsis ==
The main purpose of Linked is to introduce the science of networks to the general audience. It introduces the main models and properties of networks and their applications in areas of real life, such as the spread of epidemics, fighting against terrorism, handling economic crises or solving social problems of the society.

Barabási writes in the Introduction that Linked aims to get the reader to think networks. The book is about how networks emerge, what they look like, and how they evolve. It shows, the reader a web-based view of nature, society, and business, a new framework for understanding issues ranging from democracy to the vulnerability of the Internet and the spread of viruses, says Barabási.

== Contents ==
Linked contains fifteen chapters (named links) that introduce different concepts and applications of networks:

- The First Link: Introduction
- The Second Link: The Random Universe
- The Third Link: Six Degrees of Separation
- The Fourth Link: Small Worlds
- The Fifth Link: Hubs and Connectors
- The Six Link: The 80/20 Rule
- The Seventh Link: Rich Get Richer
- The Eighth Link: Einstein's Legacy
- The Ninth Link: Achilles' Heel
- The Tenth Link: Viruses and Fads
- The Eleventh Link: The Awakening Internet
- The Twelfth Link: The Fragmented Web
- The Thirteenth Link: The Map of Life
- The Fourteenth Link: Network Economy
- The Last Link: Web Without a Spider

== Reactions ==
Sidney Redner, leading physicist of Boston University, describes Linked In Nature as an entertaining introductory level book of modern science. He writes, “His enthusiasm is apparent throughout the narrative, a feature that makes for good reading. … I would enthusiastically recommend them to my own family members. It is remarkable and gratifying to see excellent popularizations of a burgeoning field of scientific research while many developments are still in progress.”

Ian Foster reviews Linked for Science: “…I found both books [Linked and Mark Buchanan’s Nexus] wonderfully revealing and thought provoking in terms of the broad relevance of the ideas and their future implications.”

A review by James Brody in Human Nature Review says: “Linked offers many heuristic possibilities if your interests are in genetic, neural, electronic, or social organizations. Much of the existing literature marvels at the beauty of complex organizations but doesn't take us past awe and eye candy. Yes, emergence exists but by what rules? Barabasi describes simple rules that may have tremendous power.”

New York Times business journalist William J. Holstein says: “Once you understand that concept, you're off on an intellectual detective journey. Professor Barabasi has invented a vocabulary to talk about the structure of networks.”

Blogcritics.org writes: “The joy of Albert-László Barabási's book, Linked: The New Science of Networks is that, after reading it, you can't look anywhere without seeing networks. … Buy the book. How often do you get a chance to radically alter your vision for less than $20?”
