= Matteucci Medal =

Italian award for physicists, named after Carlo Matteucci

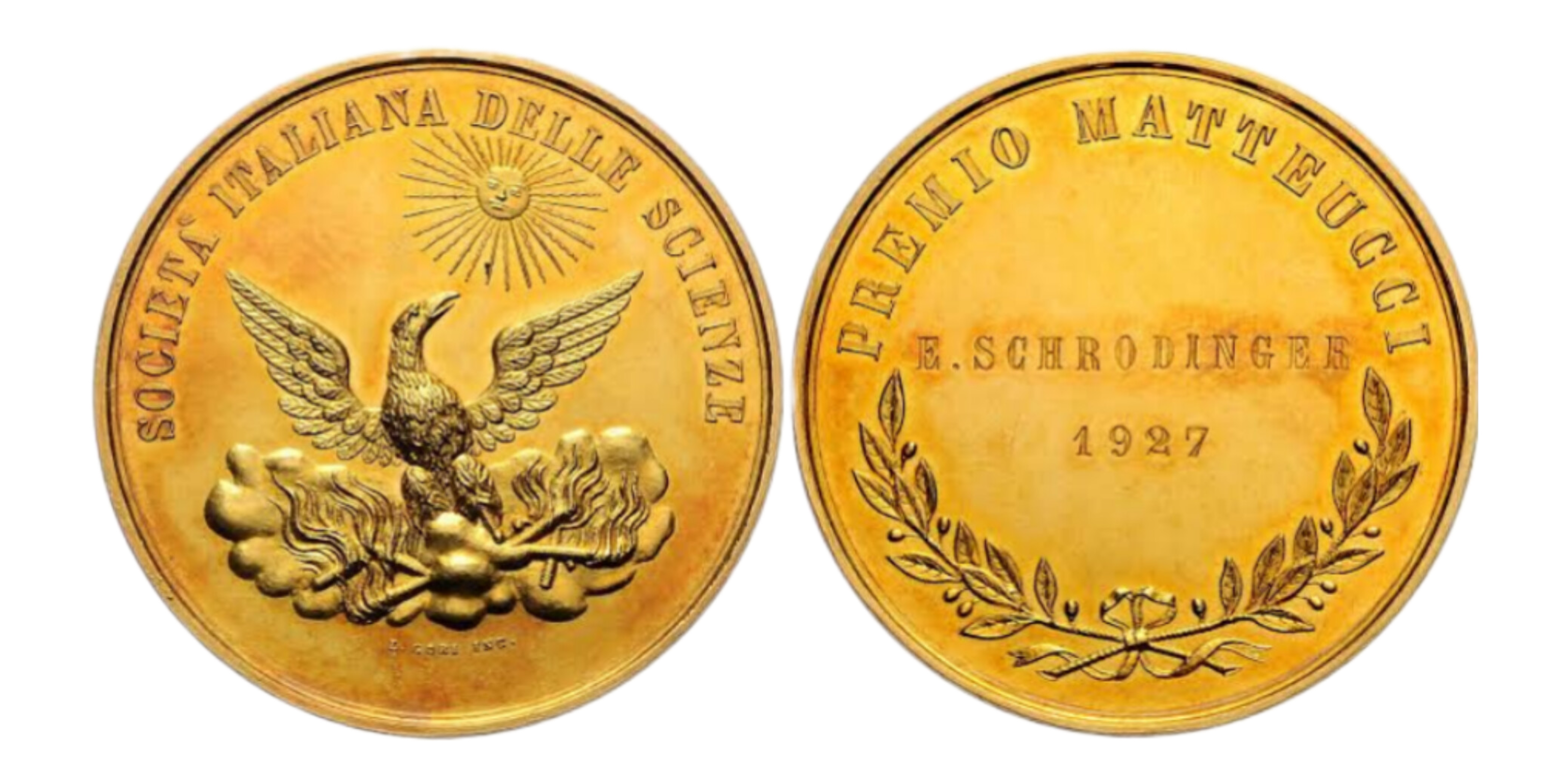

The Matteucci Medal is an Italian award for physicists, named after Carlo Matteucci from Forlì. It was established to award physicists for their fundamental contributions. Under an Italian Royal Decree dated 10 July 1870, the Italian Society of Sciences was authorized to receive a donation from Carlo Matteucci for the establishment of the Prize.

== Recipients ==
- 1868 Hermann von Helmholtz
- 1875 Henri Victor Regnault
- 1876 Lord Kelvin
- 1877 Gustav Kirchhoff
- 1878 Gustav Wiedemann
- 1879 Wilhelm Eduard Weber
- 1880 Antonio Pacinotti
- 1881 Emilio Villari
- 1882 Augusto Righi
- 1887 Thomas Edison
- 1888 Heinrich Hertz
- 1894 John William Strutt, 3rd Baron Rayleigh
- 1895 Henry Augustus Rowland
- 1896 Wilhelm Röntgen and Philipp Lenard
- 1901 Guglielmo Marconi
- 1903 Albert Abraham Michelson
- 1904 Marie Curie and Pierre Curie
- 1905 Henri Poincaré
- 1906 James Dewar
- 1907 William Ramsay
- 1908 Antonio Garbasso
- 1909 Orso Mario Corbino
- 1910 Heike Kamerlingh Onnes
- 1911 Jean Baptiste Perrin
- 1912 Pieter Zeeman
- 1913 Ernest Rutherford
- 1914 Max von Laue
- 1915 Johannes Stark
- 1915 William Henry Bragg and Lawrence Bragg
- 1917 Antonino Lo Surdo
- 1918 Robert W. Wood
- 1919 Henry Moseley
- 1921 Albert Einstein
- 1923 Niels Bohr
- 1924 Arnold Sommerfeld
- 1925 Robert Andrews Millikan
- 1926 Enrico Fermi
- 1927 Erwin Schrödinger
- 1928 C. V. Raman
- 1929 Werner Heisenberg
- 1930 Arthur Compton
- 1931 Franco Rasetti
- 1932 Frédéric Joliot-Curie and Irène Joliot-Curie
- 1956 Wolfgang Pauli
- 1975 Bruno Touschek
- 1978 Abdus Salam
- 1979 Luciano Maiani
- 1980 Giancarlo Wick
- 1982 Rudolf Peierls
- 1985 Hendrik Casimir
- 1987 Pierre-Gilles De Gennes
- 1988 Lev Okun
- 1989 Freeman Dyson
- 1990 Jack Steinberger
- 1991 Bruno Rossi
- 1992 Anatole Abragam
- 1993 John Archibald Wheeler
- 1994 Claude Cohen-Tannoudji
- 1995 Tsung Dao Lee
- 1996 Wolfgang K.H. Panofsky
- 1998 Oreste Piccioni
- 2001 Theodor W. Hänsch
- 2002 Nicola Cabibbo
- 2003 Manuel Cardona
- 2004 David Ruelle
- 2005 John Iliopoulos
- 2006 Giorgio Bellettini
- 2016 Adalberto Giazotto
- 2017 Marco Tavani
- 2018 Gianluigi Fogli
- 2019 Federico Capasso
- 2020 Massimo Inguscio
- 2021 Amos Maritan
- 2022 Jocelyn Bell Burnell
- 2023 Francesco Di Martini
- 2024 Helen Quinn

== See also ==
- List of physics awards
