= EPS Statistical and Nonlinear Physics Prize =

The EPS Statistical and Nonlinear Physics Prize is a biennial award by the European Physical Society (EPS) given since 2017. Its aim is to recognize outstanding research contributions in the area of statistical physics, nonlinear physics, complex systems, and complex networks.

== Early career recipients ==
Year	Name	Institution	Citation
2017	Laura Foini	ENS Paris	For her outstanding research contributions in the field of glassy systems and nonequilibrium dynamics of isolated quantum systems.
2017	Edgar Roldan	MPIPKS	For his outstanding research contributions at the interface of stochastic thermodynamics and biophysics.
2019	Karel Proesmans	Hasselt Univ., Belgium	For his outstanding research contributions in the field of stochastic thermodynamics, in particular his work dealing with optimization protocols for thermal engines, as well as his work on thermodynamic uncertainty relations for discrete-time and periodically driven systems.
2019	Valentina Ros	ENS Paris	For her outstanding research contributions in quantum and classical disordered systems, explaining new ways in which those systems can break ergodicity and fail to equilibrate, and her investigations of rough, high-dimensional landscapes emerging in this context.
2021	Federico Battiston	Central European University	For his outstanding work on nonlinear dynamics and emergent collective phenomena in multilayer and higher-order networks, including diffusion, synchronization, social and evolutionary processes.
2021	Caterina De Bacco	Max Planck Institute for Intelligent Systems, Tuebingen	For her outstanding work on statistical physics of random walkers on random graphs, stochastic search processes, routing optimization on networks and effective algorithms for community detection.
2023	Ada Altieri	Université Paris Cité, France	For her outstanding contribution to theory of the jamming transition and to inter-disciplinary applications of statistical physics to species-rich ecosystems.
2023	Patrick Pietzonka	Max Planck Institute for the Physics of Complex Systems, Dresden, Germany	For his outstanding contribution to the statistics of current fluctuations in active systems and to thermodynamic uncertainty relations.
2025	Francesco Mori	Oxford University, UK	For his outstanding contributions on the statistical properties of run and tumble particles, thermodynamic cost of stochastic resetting and optimal control protocols.
2025	Vittoria Sposini	Università di Padova, Italy	For her outstanding contribution to the statistical physics of anomalous diffusion, stochastic processes and random diffusivity.

== Senior recipients ==
Year	Name	Institution	Citation
2017	Peter Grassberger	University of Calgary	For their seminal contributions to nonlinear physics, in particular for introducing the correlation dimension as a measure of the fractal dimension of strange attractors and studies of other complex phenomena.
2017	Itamar Procaccia	Weizmann Institute	For their seminal contributions to nonlinear physics, in particular for introducing the correlation dimension as a measure of the fractal dimension of strange attractors and studies of other complex phenomena.
2019	Sergio Ciliberto	CNRS and ENS Lyon	For his seminal contributions over a wide range of problems in statistical and nonlinear physics, in particular for performing groundbreaking new experiments testing Fluctuation Theorems for injected power, dissipated heat, and entropy production rates, as well as investigating experimentally the connection between dissipated heat and the Landauer bound, thus demonstrating a link between information theory and thermodynamics.
2019	Satya Majumdar	CNRS University Paris-Sud	For his seminal contributions to non-equilibrium statistical physics, stochastic processes, and random matrix theory, in particular for his groundbreaking research on Abelian sandpiles, persistence statistics, force fluctuations in bead packs, large deviations of eigenvalues of random matrices, and applying the results to cold atoms and other physical systems.
2021	Albert-László Barabási	Northeastern University Harvard Medical School and Central European University	For his pioneering contributions to the development of complex network science, in particular for his seminal work on scale-free networks, the preferential attachment model, error and attack tolerance in complex networks, controllability of complex networks, the physics of social ties, communities, and human mobility patterns, genetic, metabolic, and biochemical networks, as well as applications in network biology and network medicine..
2021	Angelo Vulpiani	Università Sapienza Roma	For his seminal contributions to statistical and nonlinear physics, touching fundamentally important issues in dynamical systems theory and statistical mechanics, including the mechanism of stochastic resonance, multifractality of invariant sets of dynamical systems, the dynamics and multifractal properties of turbulent flows, chaos in Hamiltonian systems, and the limits of predictability in complex systems.
2023	Amnon Aharony	Tel Aviv University, Israel	For his seminal contributions in the application of renormalization group theory to critical phenomena and classification of universality classes, fractals and percolation, and the theory of disordered magnetic systems.
2023	Amos Maritan	University of Padova, Italy	For his seminal contributions in the understanding of the physical principles underlying collective behavior in biological systems, including protein folding, DNA organization, ecosystems, and river networks.
2025	Alessandro Vespignani	Northeastern University, USA	For his seminal contributions to the statistical physics of complex networks, bridging theoretical models with real-world systems, and for unveiling the universal principles governing epidemic spreading and information diffusion.
2025	Thomas Witten	University of Chicago, USA	For his seminal contributions to the statistical physics of aggregation, soft matter, and complex fluids, and for unveiling principles in the dynamics of polymers, interfaces, and disordered materials.

== See also ==
- List of physics awards
