= Sophistication (complexity theory) =

Measure of complexity regarding algorithmic entropy

In algorithmic information theory, sophistication is a measure of complexity related to algorithmic entropy.

When K is the Kolmogorov complexity and c is a constant, the sophistication of x can be defined as

$$\operatorname{Soph}_c(x) := \inf \{ \operatorname{K}(S) : x \in S \land \operatorname{K}(x\mid S) \ge \log_2(|S|) - c \land |S| \in \mathbb{N}_+ \}.$$

The constant c is called significance. The S variable ranges over finite sets.

Intuitively, sophistication measures the complexity of a set of which the object is a "generic" member.

== See also ==
- Logical depth
