= Amos Maritan =

Italian physicist

- Education: University of Padua, SISSA
- Awards: Matteucci Medal, EPS Statistical and Nonlinear Physics Prize
- Scientific career
- Fields: Statistical physics, quantitative biology, theoretical ecology, complex systems, stochastic processes
- Workplaces: University of Padua, SISSA
- Thesis: Topics on static and dynamic properties of fractals
- Academic advisors: Giorgio Parisi

Amos Maritan is an Italian theoretical physicist, currently full professor of theoretical physics at the University of Padua. He is noted for his contributions in statistical physics and biophysics. He was awarded the Matteucci Medal in 2021 and the EPS Statistical and Nonlinear Physics Prize in 2023.

== Biography ==
He graduated in physics at the University of Padua in 1979, and obtained a Ph.D. in physics at SISSA in 1983. He held a research position at the University of Padua from 1983 to 1987. He was later appointed as associate professor at the University of Bari until 2001. Meanwhile, he was appointed as associate professor at the University of Padua from 1991 to 1994. He was a scientific consultant at International Centre for Theoretical Physics from 1997 to 2003. He was appointed as full professor at SISSA from 1994 to 2003 and at the University of Padua from 2003.
