= Peter Grassberger =

Austrian physicist (born 1940)

- Born: 17 May 1940 (age 86); Vienna, Greater German Reich (present-day Austria)
- Education: University of Vienna
- Scientific career
- Fields: Physics
- Workplaces: University of Calgary, Forschungszentrum Jülich
- Doctoral advisor: Walter Thirring, H. Pietschmann

Peter Grassberger (born 17 May 1940) is a retired professor who worked in statistical and particle physics. He made contributions to chaos theory, where he introduced the idea of correlation dimension, a means of measuring a type of fractal dimension of the strange attractor.

== Work ==
Grassberger's early work focused on particle phenomenology, in particular on the formulation of formally exact equations for three-body scattering and bound state scattering (Alt–Grassberger–Sandhas equation).

While working at CERN, he realized that reggeon field theory can be viewed as a contact process in the same universality class as directed percolation. After making this discovery, Grassberger turned his attention to the studies of statistical physics, dynamical systems, sequential sampling algorithms, and complex systems. His publications span a variety of topics including reaction-diffusion systems, cellular automata, fractals, Ising model, Griffiths phases, self-organized criticality, and percolation.

He held long-term positions at the University of Wuppertal and at the Forschungszentrum Jülich (Germany). Other positions that lasted between 2 years and 3 months were at CERN, at the Universities of Kabul, Nice, Calgary, Rome and Utrecht, the Weizmann Institute, the Max Planck Institute for the Physics of Complex Systems in Dresden, the Istituto nazionale di ottica in Florence, and at the Institute for Advanced Studies in Basic Sciences in Zanjan, Iran.

In 2017 he received the EPS Statistical and Nonlinear Physics Prize.

== See also ==
- Complex network
- Epidemic models on lattices
- Mutual information
- Forecasting complexity
- Kolmogorov entropy

== Selected publications ==
- P. Grassberger; I. Procaccia (1983). "Measuring the strangeness of strange attractors". Physica D: Nonlinear Phenomena. 9 (1–2): 189–208. Bibcode:1983PhyD....9..189G. doi:10.1016/0167-2789(83)90298-1.
- P. Grassberger; I. Procaccia (1983). "Characterization of Strange Attractors". Physical Review Letters. 50 (5): 346–349. Bibcode:1983PhRvL..50..346G. doi:10.1103/PhysRevLett.50.346.
- E. O. Alt; P. Grassberger; W. Sandhas (1967). "Reduction of the three-particle collision problem to multi-channel two-particle Lippmann-Schwinger equations". Nuclear Physics B. 2 (2): 167–180. Bibcode:1967NuPhB...2..167A. doi:10.1016/0550-3213(67)90016-8.
- P. Grassberger; I. Procaccia (1983). "Estimation of the Kolmogorov entropy from a chaotic signal". Physical Review A. 28 (4): 2591–2593. Bibcode:1983PhRvA..28.2591G. doi:10.1103/PhysRevA.28.2591.
- P. Grassberger (1983). "Generalized dimensions of strange attractors". Physics Letters A. 97 (6): 227–230. Bibcode:1983PhLA...97..227G. doi:10.1016/0375-9601(83)90753-3.
- P. Grassberger; I. Procaccia (1984). "Dimensions and entropies of strange attractors from a fluctuating dynamics approach". Physica D: Nonlinear Phenomena. 13 (1–2): 34–54. Bibcode:1984PhyD...13...34G. doi:10.1016/0167-2789(84)90269-0.
- P. Grassberger; A. de la Torre (1979). "Reggeon field theory (Schlögl's first model) on a lattice: Monte Carlo calculations of critical behaviour". Annals of Physics. 122 (2): 373–396. Bibcode:1979AnPhy.122..373G. doi:10.1016/0003-4916(79)90207-0.
- P. Grassberger; R. Badii; A. Politi (1988). "Scaling laws for invariant measures on hyperbolic and nonhyperbolic atractors". Journal of Statistical Physics. 51 (1–2): 135–178. Bibcode:1988JSP....51..135G. doi:10.1007/BF01015324. S2CID 121999076.
- P. Grassberger (1982). "On phase transitions in Schlögl's second model". Zeitschrift für Physik B. 47 (4): 365–374. Bibcode:1982ZPhyB..47..365G. doi:10.1007/BF01313803. S2CID 120131896.
- P. Grassberger; I. Procaccia (1982). "The long time properties of diffusion in a medium with static traps". J. Chem. Phys. 77 (12): 6281–6284. Bibcode:1982JChPh..77.6281G. doi:10.1063/1.443832.
- J.G. Foster; D.V. Foster; P. Grassberger; M. Paczuski (2009). "Edge Direction and the Structure of Networks". Proceedings of the National Academy of Sciences of the United States of America. 107 (24): 10815–10820. arXiv:0908.4288. Bibcode:2010PNAS..10710815F. doi:10.1073/pnas.0912671107. PMC 2890716. PMID 20505119.
