= Baruch Barzel =

Israeli physicist and mathematician (born 1976)

- ברוך ברזל
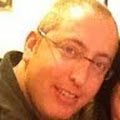
- Baruch Barzel
- Born: 19 March 1976 (age 50); Jerusalem
- Citizenship: Israel
- Education: Bar-Ilan University (BS)
- Occupations: Physicist and Applied mathematician
- Known for: his research on complex and stochastic systems, specifically on stochastic moment equations and universality in network dynamics. Also a public lecturer in Israel, and presents a weekly corner on Jewish thought in Israeli Public Broadcasting Corporation.

Baruch Barzel (Hebrew: ברוך ברזל; March 19, 1976) is an Israeli physicist and applied mathematician at Bar-Ilan University, a member of the Gonda Multidisciplinary Brain Research Center and of the Bar-Ilan Data Science Institute. His main research areas are statistical physics, complex systems, nonlinear dynamics and network science.

In 2013 he introduced the concept of universality in the dynamics of complex networks, showing that complex systems from different domains condense into discrete forms, or universality classes, of dynamic behavior. In the following years, Barzel and colleagues developed a theoretical framework to predict the observed behavior of complex networked systems: their patterns of information flow; the timescales of their signal propagation; their resilience against failures and disruptions and their recoverability.

During the COVID-19 Pandemic Barzel's lab published the alternating quarantine strategy to mitigate the spread of SARS-CoV-2 alongside continuous socioeconomic activity. The strategy was implemented by several agencies in Israel and around the world.

== Academic career ==
Barzel completed his Ph.D. in physics at the Hebrew University of Jerusalem as a Hoffman Fellow. He then pursued his postdoctoral training at the Center for Complex Network Research at Northeastern University and at the Channing Division of Network Medicine, Harvard Medical School. Barzel is a recipient of the Racah prize (2007) and the Krill prize of the Wolf Foundation (2019). Barzel is also an active public lecturer on science and on Judaism, and presents a weekly corner on Jewish thought on Israeli Public Broadcasting Corporation .

Dr. Barzel's research focuses on the dynamic behavior of complex networks, uncovering universal principles that govern the dynamics of diverse systems, such as disease spreading, gene regulatory networks, protein interactions or population dynamics.

== Selected publications ==
- Barzel, B.; Biham, O. (2011). "Binomial Moment Equations for Stochastic Reaction Systems". Physical Review Letters. 106 (15) 150602. arXiv:1011.0012. Bibcode:2011PhRvL.106o0602B. doi:10.1103/PhysRevLett.106.150602. PMID 21568538. S2CID 293255.
- Barzel, B.; Barabási, A.-L. (2013). "Universality in Network Dynamics". Nature Physics. 9 (10): 673–681. Bibcode:2013NatPh...9..673B. doi:10.1038/nphys2741. PMC 3852675. PMID 24319492.
- Barzel, B.; Barabási, A.-L. (2013). "Network link prediction by global silencing of indirect correlations". Nature Biotechnology. 31 (8): 720–725. doi:10.1038/nbt.2601. PMC 3740009. PMID 23851447. S2CID 5470514.
- Barzel, Y.-Y. Liu; Barabási, A.-L. (2015). "Constructing minimal models for complex system dynamics". Nature Communications. 6: 7186. Bibcode:2015NatCo...6.7186B. doi:10.1038/ncomms8186. PMID 25990707.
- Yan, G.; Tsekenis, G.; Liu, Y.-Y.; Slotine, J.J.; Barabási, A.-L. (2015). "Spectrum of controlling and observing complex networks". Nature Physics. 11 (9): 779–786. arXiv:1503.01160. Bibcode:2015NatPh..11..779Y. doi:10.1038/nphys3422. S2CID 14168596.
- J. Gao, B. Barzel and A.-L. Barabási, "Universal resilience patterns in complex networks", Nature 530, 307 (2016)
- U. Harush and B. Barzel, "Dynamic patterns of information flow in complex networks", Nature Communications 8, 2181 (2017)
- C. Hens, U. Harush, S. Haber, R. Cohen and B. Barzel, "Spatiotemporal signal propagation in complex networks", Nature Physics (2019)
- D. Meidan, N. Schulmann, R. Cohen, S. Haber, E. Yaniv, R. Sarid and B. Barzel, Alternating quarantine for sustainable epidemic mitigation. Nature Communications 12, 220 (2021).
- H. Sanhedrai, J. Gao, A. Bashan, M. Schwartz, S. Havlin and B. Barzel, Reviving a failed network through microscopic interventions. Nature Physics 18, 338 (2022).
- C. Meena, C. Hens, S. Acharyya, S. Haber, S. Boccaletti and B. Barzel, Emergent stability in complex network dynamics. Nature Physics (2023).

== Public lectures and media coverage ==
- Universal resilience patterns in complex networks in Ynet (Hebrew)
- Bar-Ilan Nitzotzot meeting 2015 (Hebrew) "Connecting the world in six steps"
- Interview on Channel 20, 2019 (Hebrew)
- Network Earth, 2019
- Universality in network dynamics in 2Physics
- Predicting the tipping point of complex systems in The Munich eye
- A new framework to predict spatiotemporal signal propagation in complex networks in Phys.org
- Profile article on the Complex Network Dynamics lab in Makor Rishon (Hebrew)
- Krav Mada radio lecture series in Galei Zahal (Hebrew)
- Israeli experts propose radical post-corona exit strategy in Israel21
- An alternative quarantine strategy in El Economista
- A well-calculated proposal: mathematical proposal to fight COVID-19 and get out of the economic blockade in Aula Magna

More here.
