= Isolation index =

Sociology concept

Isolation index measures the degree to which people inhabit geographic units inhabited primarily by members of their own group. It is usually denoted by I. It varies from 0 to 1.0 and is defined as the proportion of own-group members in the unit of the average person. In measuring black isolation, for example, a score of 1.0 means that the average black person lives in a neighborhood that is 100 percent black, and a score approaching 0 means that this person lives in a neighborhood where he or she is nearly the only black resident. They have been used in studies of racial segregation and ideological segregation. Isolation index is not invariant to relative size of group.

Examples of isolation indices include Lieberson's isolation index and Bell's isolation index.

== Formula ==
The formula to compute the isolation index is given by:

$I= \sum_{i=1}^{n}[(\frac{a_i}{A})(\frac{a_i}{a_i + b_i})]$

where $a_i$ is the population of group $A$ in region $i$, $b_i$ is the population of group $B$ in region $i$, $A$ is the total population of group $A$.

== Numerical Example ==
Consider the following distribution of white and black population across neighborhoods.

Neighborhood	White	Black	$I_i$
A	100	5	0.01
B	100	10	0.036
C	100	10	0.036
Total	300	25	0.082

== See also ==
- Diversity index
- Index of dissimilarity
