= Online segregation =

Online segregation is the unintentional segregation of people on the Internet, which is often believed to be a democratizing tool used to bring equality among people. For example, popular social network services such as MySpace and Facebook have been argued to magnify social, political, and class divides that already exist in the real world.

== Impression Management ==
A study on respectability politics argues that "modern social media presents new challenges for self-presentation and impression management." In the media, people are often forced behave according to the White power structure and keep in mind the appropriate rhetoric, context, or style that fits the taste of White people. This accounts for the concept of "imagined audience," where social norms and social context impact the visibility of people—especially that of minorities—online.

== See also ==
- Segregation (at Wiktionary)
- Racial segregation
- Age segregation
- Age verification
- Occupational segregation
- Echo chamber (media)
