= Self-dissimilarity =

Self-dissimilarity is a measure of complexity defined in a series of papers by David Wolpert and William G. Macready. The degrees of self-dissimilarity between the patterns of a system observed at various scales (e.g. the average matter density of a physical body for volumes at different orders of magnitude) constitute a complexity "signature" of that system.

== See also ==
- Diversity index
- Index of dissimilarity
- Jensen–Shannon divergence
- Self-similarity
- Similarity measure
- Variance
