= Forecasting complexity =

Forecasting complexity is a measure of complexity put forward (under the original name of) by the physicist Peter Grassberger.

It was later renamed "statistical complexity" by James P. Crutchfield and Karl Young.
