= Collective cell migration =

Emergent cell behavior

Collective cell migration describes the movements of group of cells and the emergence of collective behavior from cell-environment interactions and cell-cell communication. Collective cell migration is an essential process in the lives of multicellular organisms, e.g. embryonic development, wound healing and cancer spreading (metastasis). Cells can migrate as a cohesive group (e.g. epithelial cells) or have transient cell-cell adhesion sites (e.g. mesenchymal cells). They can also migrate in different modes like sheets, strands, tubes, and clusters. While single-cell migration has been extensively studied, collective cell migration is a relatively new field with applications in preventing birth defects or dysfunction of embryos. It may improve cancer treatment by enabling doctors to prevent tumors from spreading and forming new tumors.

== Cell-environment interactions ==
The environment of the migrating cell can affect its speed, persistence and direction of migration by stimulating it. The extracellular matrix (ECM) provides not only the structural and biochemical support, but also plays a major role in regulating cell behavior. Different ECM proteins (such as collagen, elastin, fibronectin, laminin, and others) allow cells to adhere and migrate, while forming focal adhesions in the front and disassembling them in the back. Using these adhesion sites, cells also sense the mechanical properties of the ECM. Cells can be guided by a gradient of those proteins (haptotaxis) or a gradient of soluble substrates in the liquid phase surrounding the cell (chemotaxis). Cells sense the substrate through their receptors and migrate toward the concentration (or the opposite direction). Another form of stimulation can be rigidity gradients of the ECM (durotaxis).

=== Confinement ===
Collective cell migration is enhanced by geometrical confinement of an extracellular matrix molecule (e.g. the proteoglycan versican in neural crest cells), that acts as a barrier, to promote the emergence of organized migration in separated streams. Confinement is also observed in vivo, where the optimal width is a function of the number of migrating cells in different streams of different species.

== Cell-cell communication ==
Migrating isolated cell responds to cues in its environment and changes its behavior accordingly. As cell-cell communication does not play a major role in this case, similar trajectories are observed in different isolated cells. However, when the cell migrates as part of the collective, it not only responds to its environment but also interacts with other cells through soluble substrates and physical contact. These cell-cell communication mechanisms are the main reasons for the difference between efficient migration of the collective and random walk movements of the isolated cell. Cell-cell communication mechanisms are widely studied experimentally (in vivo and in vitro), and computationally (in silico).

=== Co-attraction ===
Co-attraction between collectively migrating cells is the process by which cells of the same type secrete chemo-attractant (e.g. C3a in neural crest cells), that stimulates other cells in the group that have the receptors to that chemo-attractant. Cells sense the secreted substrate and respond to the stimulation by moving towards each other's and maintain high cell density.

=== Contact inhibition of locomotion ===
Contact inhibition of locomotion (CIL) is a process in which the cell changes its direction of movement after colliding into another cell. Those cells could be of the same cell type or different types. The contacts (cell-junctions) are created by transmembrane glycoproteins named cadherins (E-cadherin, N-cadherin or cadherin 11) and other proteins. After cell-cell contact, the protrusions of cells in the contact direction are inhibited. In the CIL process, cells migrate away from each other by repolarizing in the new direction, so that new protrusions are formed in the front while contractions pull the back from contact.

- Contact inhibition of proliferation (CIP) is the inhibition of cell division with increasing percent of confluency. CIP and CIL are two different processes, which are sometimes mistakenly interrelated.

== Examples of studied systems ==
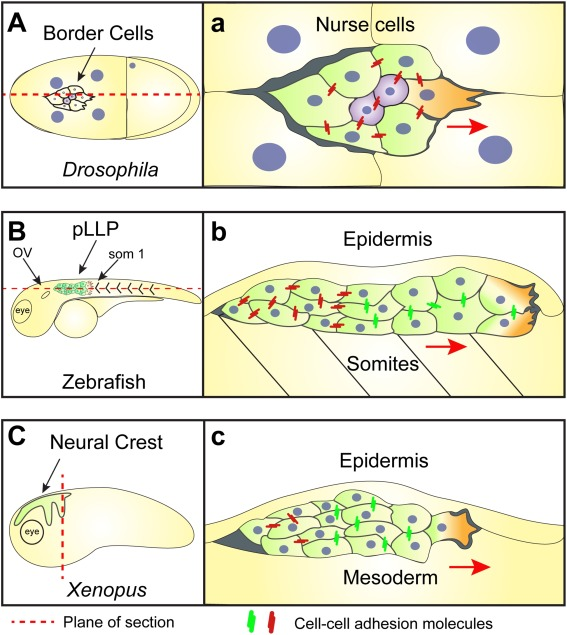
Models for studying collective cell migration Red arrows show the direction of migration for each tissue

Collective cell migration is studied over many model species.

Border cells in flies (Drosophila melanogaster): the border cells migrate during the differentiation of egg cells to be ready for fertilization.

The lateral line in zebrafish: collective cell migration from head to tails is essential to the development of the sensory system of the fish. The sensors of the lateral line measure the flow over the body-surface of the fish.

Wound healing: collective cell migration is an essential part in this healing process, wound area is closed by the migrating cells. Wound healing is commonly studied in vitro using cell lines such as Madin-Darby Canine Kidney cells.

Neural crest cells in mice, Leghorn chicks, amphibians (Xenopus laevis), and fish (zebrafish): collective migration of neural crest cells occurs during embryo development of vertebrates. They migrate long distances from the head (neural tube) to give rise to different tissues.

Spreading of cancer (metastasis): common complication of cancer involve formation of new tumors (secondary tumors), as a result of migration of cancer cells from the primary tumor. Similar to collective cell migration in development and wound healing, cancer cells also undergo epithelial to mesenchymal transition (EMT), that reduces cell-cell adhesions and allows cancer spreading.

The diagram on the right shows:

- A: Border cell migration in a Drosophila embryo. (a) shows border cells migrating in a confined space surrounded by gigantic nurse cells.
- B: The initial position of zebrafish posterior lateral line primordia (pLLP) cells. (b) is a sagittal section showing how these cells migrate in a confined space between the somatic mesoderm and epidermis.
- C: The cephalic neural crest of the clawed frog Xenopus migrating in well-defined streams from dorsal to ventral and anterior. (c) is a transverse section across the head of a Xenopus embryo showing the high degree of confinement experienced by the neural crest while migrating sandwiched between the epidermis and underlying head mesoderm.

== Mathematical models ==
There are several mathematical models that describe collective cell motion. Typically, a Newtonian equation of motion for a system of cells is solved. Several forces act on each individual cell, examples are friction (between environment and other cells), chemotaxis and self-propulsion. The latter implies that cells are active matter far from thermal equilibrium that are able to generate force due to myosin-actin contractile motion. An overview over physical description of collective cell migration explains that the following types of models can be used:

- Lattice models (e.g. BIO-LGCA models)
- Models similar to Dissipative particle dynamics that solve Newton's equation of motion with dissipative and random forces
- Models where cells depict Voronoi regions and an effective potential (based on Voronoi graphs) for the tissue is used
- Continuum models, e.g. with the use of a phase field
- Kinetic theories similar to the Boltzmann equation

These mathematical models give some insight in complex phenomena like cancer, wound healing and ectoplasms.

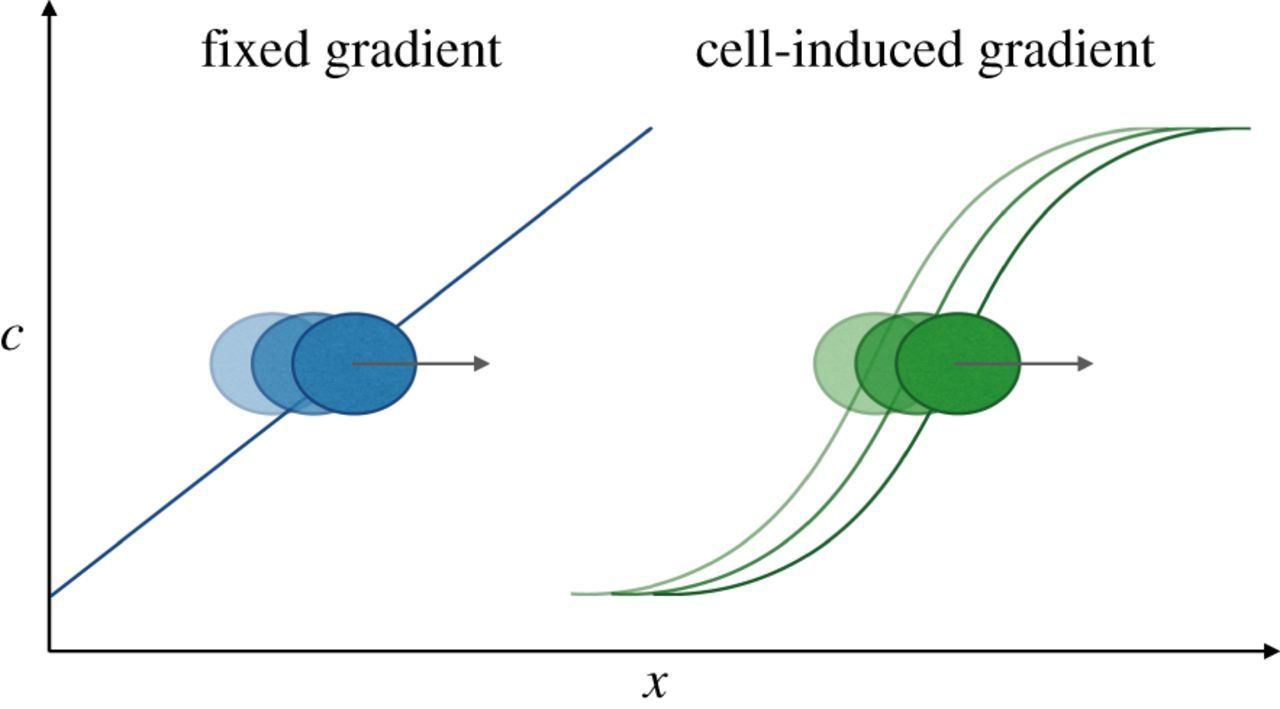
Chemotaxis of a cell up a fixed (left, blue) and cell-induced, or self-generated, gradient (right, green) of chemoattractant. Lines show the concentration (c) of chemoattractant along space (x), in which cells (ellipses) migrate. Darker shapes illustrate successive time-points.

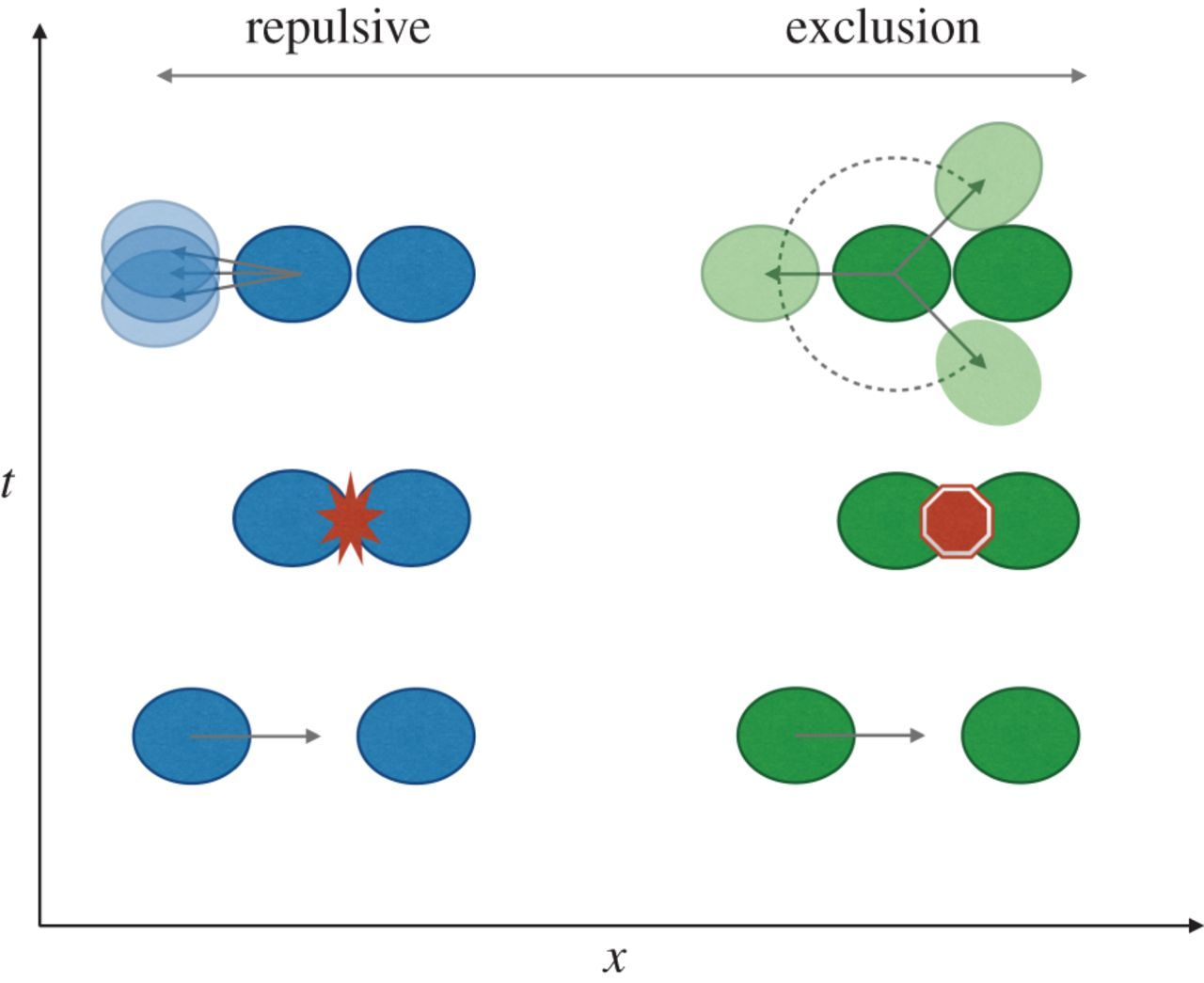
Spectrum of cell–cell interactions, from repulsive interactions (left, blue) to volume exclusion (right, green). With repulsive interactions, cells move away from the point of contact with another cell (second cell shown as stationary for simplicity). With volume exclusion, cells block each other's movement, but can move to any space not occupied by another cell.

=== Spectrum of collective cell migration ===
In the diagram immediately below, different morphologies of collective cell migration are characterized by their cohesiveness during migration (inversely related to density), as well as the number of nearest neighbours with which a cell interacts while moving (i.e. the topological arrangement of individual cells in the population). Cells (ellipses) can migrate in linear chains (top left), with persistent contact to cells either side of them, or along trails formed by preceding cells (bottom left). In migrating sheets, cells may maintain most of their nearest neighbours over time (top right), whereas in streaming migration cell–cell contacts occur at longer range and with potentially frequent neighbour rearrangement (bottom right). These concepts easily extend to three-dimensional migration, in which case the place of migrating sheets can be taken by moving clusters or spheroids.

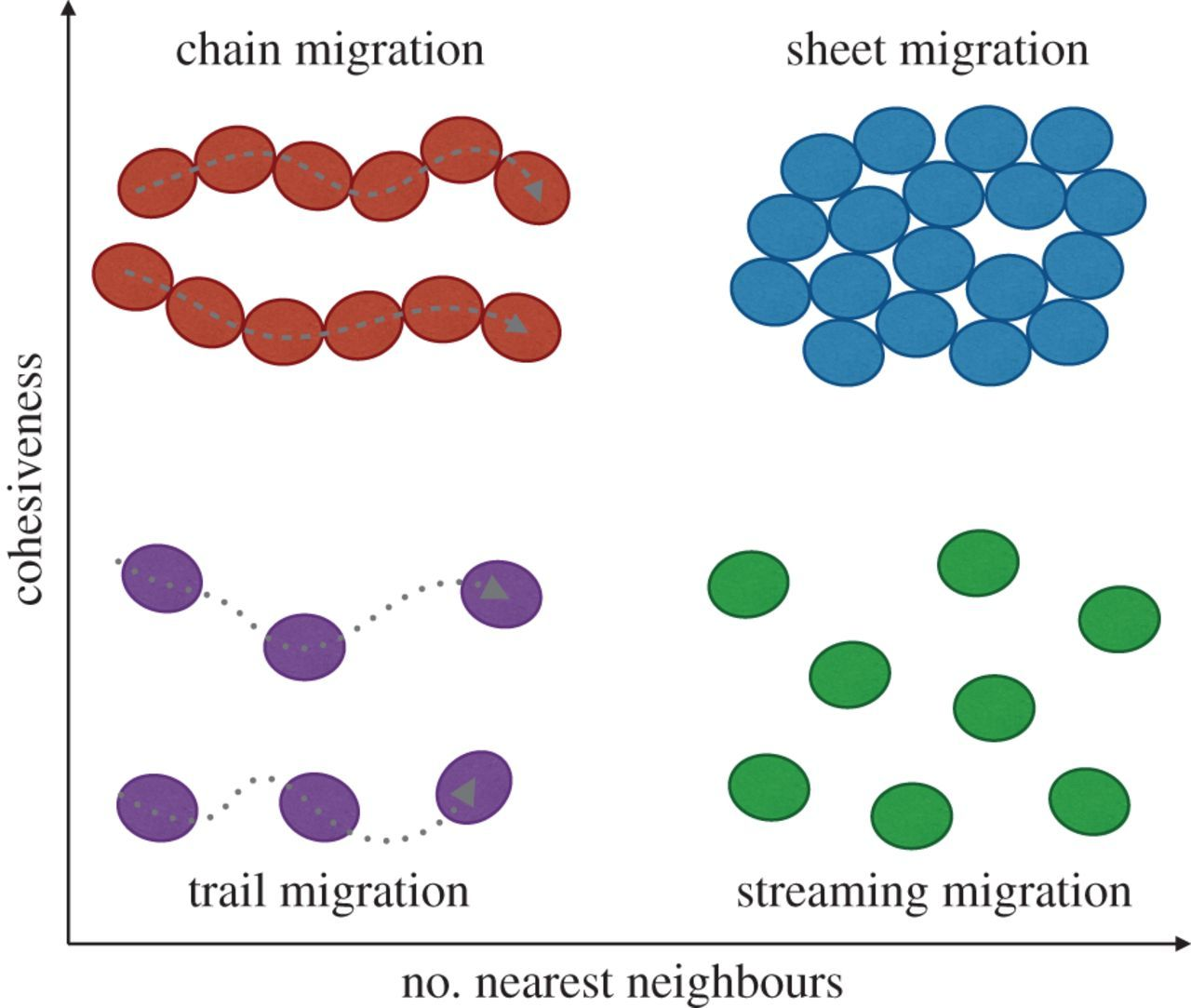
Spectrum of collective cell migration

== See also ==
- Bacteria collective motion
- Boids
- Collective animal behavior
- Collective motion
- Embryogenesis
