= David Saintillan =

Mechanical Engineer

- Education: École Polytechnique; Stanford University
- Known for: Saintillan–Shelley model
- Awards: Pi Tau Sigma Gold Medal (2011); Fellow of the American Physical Society (2018)
- Scientific career
- Fields: Fluid dynamics, soft matter
- Workplaces: University of California, San Diego; University of Illinois Urbana-Champaign; Courant Institute of Mathematical Sciences
- Doctoral advisor: Eric Shaqfeh; Eric Darve

David Saintillan is an applied mathematician and mechanical engineer whose research is in fluid dynamics and soft matter. He is a professor of mechanical and aerospace engineering at the University of California, San Diego. With Michael J. Shelley, he developed a kinetic theory of active suspensions that subsequently became known as the Saintillan–Shelley model, or Doi–Saintillan–Shelley model. Saintillan was elected a Fellow of the American Physical Society in 2018.

== Early life and education ==
Saintillan was educated at the École Polytechnique in France, where he obtained an engineering degree in 2001. He then studied mechanical engineering at Stanford University, receiving an M.S. in 2003 and a Ph.D. in 2006. His doctoral research, supervised by Eric Shaqfeh and Eric Darve, received the 2007 Andreas Acrivos Dissertation Award in Fluid Dynamics from the American Physical Society.

Following his Ph.D., Saintillan worked as a research scientist at the Courant Institute of Mathematical Sciences at New York University.

== Academic career ==
Saintillan joined the faculty at the University of Illinois Urbana-Champaign in 2008 as an assistant professor of mechanical science and engineering. He moved to the University of California, San Diego in 2013, joining the Department of Mechanical and Aerospace Engineering, where he later became a full professor.

== Research ==
Saintillan's research is in fluid mechanics and soft matter, with an emphasis on dynamics and transport phenomena in complex and biological fluids at small scales. His work has included theoretical and computational studies of active matter and the dynamics of flexible filaments and polymers in viscous flows.

=== Active suspensions ===
Saintillan's early research included work on the collective dynamics of active suspensions, such as suspensions of swimming microorganisms. With Michael J. Shelley, he developed a kinetic theory modeling the coupled dynamics of self-propelled particles and the surrounding fluid. The theory predicted hydrodynamic instabilities in uniformly aligned and isotropic suspensions that can give rise to collective motion and large-scale coherent flows.

The kinetic framework developed in this work later became known in the literature as the Saintillan–Shelley model, or more generally the Doi–Saintillan–Shelley model. The model was subsequently used and extended by independent researchers in the field to study stability, pattern formation, and mathematical properties of active suspensions.

Saintillan has also studied the rheology of active fluids, explaining how stresses generated by microorganisms can alter the effective viscosity and transport properties of a suspension.

=== Flexible filaments ===
Saintillan has also studied the dynamics of elastic filaments in viscous fluids. This work has examined how competition between viscous forces and elastic resistance can produce buckling and other morphological transitions. Studies of sedimenting filaments and filaments in straining flow have characterized the onset of elastohydrodynamic buckling and the resulting nonlinear dynamics.

In later work combining numerical modeling with microfluidic experiments on actin filaments, Saintillan and collaborators studied morphological transitions of flexible filaments in shear and compressional flows. In shear flow, they identified transitions from tumbling to buckling and to strongly deformed states characterized by localized high-curvature bends propagating along the filament.

Saintillan and collaborators showed that strong compressional flows can cause initially straight, achiral filaments to buckle into three-dimensional helicoidal shapes. The transition arises from the nonlinear interaction of perpendicular planar buckling modes and does not require intrinsic chirality or applied twisting moments.

== Honors and awards ==
- 2011 – Pi Tau Sigma Gold Medal in Mechanical Engineering, American Society of Mechanical Engineers
- 2018 – Fellow of the American Physical Society, cited "for incisive analysis of suspension dynamics involving complex and active particles and including electrokinetic effects".
