= Border cell =

The term Border cell might refer to:

- Border cell (brain) of entorhinal cortex.
- Border cells (Drosophila), in the ovary of the fly genus Drosophila
- Border cells (plant roots), of the root cap.
