= Optimization mechanism =

Network science algorithm

In network science, the optimization mechanism is a network growth algorithm, which randomly places new nodes in the system, and connects them to the existing nodes based on a cost-benefit analysis. Depending on the parameters used in the optimization mechanism, the algorithm can build three types of networks: a star network, a random network, and a scale-free network. Optimization mechanism is thought to be the underlying mechanism in several real networks, such as transportation networks, power grid, router networks, the network of highways, etc.

== General Properties ==
The optimization mechanism is a model with growth, in which preferential attachment is valid under certain assumptions. As opposed to the copying model, the optimization model uses global information about the network, to connect the newly entering nodes to the existing ones, thus reducing the amount of randomness in the process. The model's mechanism is based on a cost-benefit comparison, that is for each entering node 'i', the algorithm calculates the net benefit (benefits minus costs) of connecting 'i' to each existing node, and connects node 'i' to the node which gives the highest net benefit.

== Description ==
The costs and benefits in the optimization models can generally be simplified into two attributes: the distance between the new node, and the existing one; and the distance of the existing node from the central node. Thus the goal function can be written in the following form:

$C_i=min_j[\delta*d_{ij}+h_j]$

- where $C_i$ stands for the minimal cost of attaching node 'i' to an existing node
- $d_{ij}$ denotes the distance between node 'i' and 'j'
- $h_j$ represents the distance of node 'j' from the central node
- $\delta$ is a parameter, that determines the weight of the individual distance compared to the distance to the central node, and thus it varies across different settings.

In a highway network setting - where cities are nodes and links are highways - $d_{ij}$ would be the physical distance between cities, and $h_j$ would be the distance from the capital (or from the central city of the region). The value of $\delta$ determines the type of the network built by the optimization mechanism.

=== Star Network ===
The optimization mechanism results in a star network, whenever $\delta<(1/2)^{1/2}$. A unique feature of the star network is that most of the newly added nodes will connect to the central node regardless of the distance. One can think of a star network as a network in which the costs to establish a new link are negligible compared to the benefit of being directly connected to the central node. Star networks are rarely observed in reality.

=== Random Network ===
A random network is built using the optimization method when $\delta>N^{1/2}$. In case of a high enough $\delta$, the costs to establish a new link are enormously high, compared to the benefit of being closely connected to the central node. As a result, most of the new nodes will connect to the closest node available. A real life example is the power grid network, where the cost of building a power line is high, and the benefits of being directly connected to the power source is negligible.

=== Scale-free Network ===
$4<\delta<N^{1/2}$. If $\delta$ is neither too high, nor too low, the mechanism results in a scale-free network, characterised by preferential attachment. The newly added nodes tend to connect to the larger nodes, but sometimes they may connect to middle-size nodes, or even small ones, depending on their distance. Most of the real-life networks characterized by an underlying optimization mechanism are scale-free networks, such as the router network and the highway network.
