= Okubo–Weiss parameter =

In fluid mechanics, the Okubo–Weiss (OW) parameter, (normally denoted by "W") is a scalar quantity used to partition a two-dimensional flow field into regions dominated by rotation (vorticity) and regions dominated by deformation (strain). It is widely applied in geophysical fluid dynamics, particularly in the analysis of oceanic and atmospheric flows, where it serves as a diagnostic tool for identifying and characterizing coherent structures such as eddies.

For a horizontally non-divergent flow in the ocean, the parameter is given by:

$$W = s_n^2 + s_s^2 - \omega^2$$

where:

- $s_n$ is the normal strain.
- $s_s$ is the shear strain.
- $\omega$ is the relative vorticity.

OW is widely used in the fields of Meteorology and Oceanography to identify regions of strong vorticity within atmospheric and oceanic flows. It is often employed as a tracer for cyclonic development because it is generally less "noisy" than relative vorticity alone. The Okubo-Weiss parameter quantifies the balance between rotational and deformational components of the flow: positive values indicate that deformation dominated, while negative values indicate that rotation is dominant.

== Derivation ==
Let $\vec{u}(\vec{x};t_0)=(u,v)(x,y;t_0)$ be a two-dimensional velocity field at an instant in time, $t=t_0$. If $\vec{x}=\vec{x}_0$ is a non-singular point in the flow then it is possible to write down a Taylor series approximation

$${d\over dt}\begin{pmatrix}x\\y\end{pmatrix}=\begin{pmatrix}u\\v\end{pmatrix}_{\vec{x}_0}+\begin{pmatrix}({\partial u\over\partial x})_{\vec{x}_0} & ({\partial u\over\partial y})_{\vec{x}_0}\\({\partial v\over\partial x})_{\vec{x}_0} & ({\partial v\over\partial y})_{\vec{x}_0}\end{pmatrix}\begin{pmatrix}x\\y\end{pmatrix}+\ldots$$

The zeroth-order term is the translation of the fluid at $\vec{x}_0$ whilst the matrix

$$A=\begin{pmatrix}({\partial u\over\partial x})_{\vec{x}_0} & ({\partial u\over\partial y})_{\vec{x}_0}\\({\partial v\over\partial x})_{\vec{x}_0} & ({\partial v\over\partial y})_{\vec{x}_0}\end{pmatrix}$$

defines the local structure of the flow around $\vec{x}_0$ in a region which is finite provided that the determinant of $A$ is non-zero. In the Galilean frame in which $\vec{x}_0$ is stationary ($\vec{u}(\vec{x}_0)=0$), the matrix $A$ determines the structure of streamlines which are trajectories of the linear dynamical system:

$${d\over dt}\begin{pmatrix}x\\y\end{pmatrix}=A\begin{pmatrix}x\\y\end{pmatrix}$$

The eigenvalues of $A$ are

$\lambda_{\pm} = {1\over2}\left(\gamma\pm\left(s_{n}^{2}+s_{s}^{2}-\omega^2\right)^{1/2}\right)={1\over2}\left(\gamma\pm W^{1/2}\right)$

where $\gamma=Tr(A)$ is the divergence of the flow field $\vec{u}$. The sign of the Okubo-Weiss parameter, $W$, therefore determines whether the eigenvalues of the flow at $\vec{x}_0$ are real or complex. Complex eigenvalues imply that streamlines are spirals, converging (diverging) to (from) $\vec{x}_0$ if $\gamma$ is negative (positive).

Geophysical and astrophysical flows are often approximated as incompressible ($\gamma=0$). In this case streamlines about a stationary point $\vec{x}_0$ are, up to linear order, entirely determined by $W$ and are either saddle points, if $W>0$, or neutral spirals if $W<0$, corresponding to vortices. If $W=0$ then quadratic order terms are necessary to determine the local structure.

== Generalization to three dimensions ==
The influence of gravity in geophysics means that flows can often be modelled as quasi-two dimensional, but the Okubo-Weiss criterion can also be generalized to three dimensions.

There are three reasonable criteria for vortices which can be shown to be equivalent to the Okubo-Weiss criterion in the two-dimensional limit.

Let $\vec{x}_0$ be a fixed point of the flow $\vec{u}(\vec{x};t)$, then the neighborhood of $\vec{x}_0$ is a vortex if

1. The velocity gradient tensor $\vec{\nabla}\vec{u}$ has complex eigenvalues, or
2. $Q={1\over2}\left((Tr[L])^2-Tr[L^2]\right)>0$, or
3. The second largest eigenvalue of the symmetric tensor $S^2+\Omega^2$ is negative, where $S$ and $\Omega$ are the symmetric and anti-symmetric components of $\vec{\nabla}\vec{u}$ respectively.

== Other applications ==
- Head et al. find that +1/2 topological defects in active nematics are associated with isolines of $Q$, which are curves along which the strain and vorticity exactly balance.
