= Collective motion =

Spontaneous ordered movement of independent agents

Collective motion is defined as the spontaneous emergence of ordered movement in a system consisting of many self-propelled agents. It can be observed in everyday life, for example in flocks of birds, schools of fish, herds of animals and also in crowds and car traffic. It also appears at the microscopic level: in colonies of bacteria, motility assays and artificial self-propelled particles.. The scientific community is trying to understand the universality of this phenomenon. In particular it is intensively investigated in statistical physics and in the field of active matter. Experiments on animals, biological and synthesized self-propelled particles, simulations and theories are conducted in parallel to study these phenomena. One of the most famous models that describes such behavior is the Vicsek model introduced by Tamás Vicsek et al. in 1995.

== Collective behavior of Self-propelled particles ==
Just like biological systems in nature, self-propelled particles also respond to external gradients and show collective behavior. Micromotors or nanomotors can interact with self-generated gradients and exhibit schooling and exclusion behavior. For example, Ibele, et al. demonstrated that silver chloride micromotors, in the presence of UV light, interact with each other at high concentrations and form schools. Similar behavior can also be observed with titanium dioxide microparticles. Silver orthophosphate microparticles exhibit transitions between schooling and exclusion behaviors in response to ammonia, hydrogen peroxide, and UV light. This behavior can be used to design a NOR gate since different combinations of the two different stimuli (ammonia and UV light) generate different outputs. Oscillations between schooling and exclusion behaviors are also tunable via changes in hydrogen peroxide concentration. The fluid flows generated by these oscillations are strong enough to transport microscale cargo and can even direct the assembly of close-packed colloidal crystal systems. Motile emulsions are also known to exhibit emergent, collective behavior. For example, oil and surfactant combinations can be altered in oil-in-water emulsions, to switch between attractive and repulsive interactions between the droplets. These interactions between the droplets can facilitate formation of dynamic, self-organized patterns.

Micromotors and nanomotors can also move preferentially in the direction of externally applied chemical gradients, a phenomenon defined as chemotaxis. Chemotaxis has been observed in self-propelled Au-Pt nanorods, which diffuse towards the source of hydrogen peroxide, when placed in a gradient of the chemical. Silica microparticles with Grubbs catalyst tethered to them, also move towards higher monomer concentrations. Enzymes also behave as nanomotors and migrate towards regions of higher substrate concentration, which is known as enzyme chemotaxis. One interesting use of enzyme nanomotor chemotaxis is the separation of active and inactive enzymes in microfluidic channels. Another is the exploration of metabolon formation by studying the coordinated movement of the first four enzymes of the glycolysis cascade: hexokinase, phosphoglucose isomerase, phosphofructokinase and aldolase. More recently, enzyme-coated particles and enzyme-coated liposomes have shown similar behavior in gradients of reactants in microfluidic channels. In general, chemotaxis of biological and synthesized self-propelled particles provides a way of directing motion at the microscale and can be used for drug delivery, sensing, lab-on-a-chip devices and other applications.

== See also ==
- Bacteria collective motion
- Collective animal behavior
- Collective cell migration
- Microswimmer

== Further references ==
- Bricard, A.; Caussin, J. B.; Desreumaux, N.; Dauchot, O.; Bartolo, D. (2013). "Emergence of macroscopic directed motion in populations of motile colloids". Nature. 503 (7474): 95–98. arXiv:1311.2017. Bibcode:2013Natur.503...95B. doi:10.1038/nature12673. PMID 24201282. S2CID 1174081.
- Vicsek, T.; Zafeiris, A. (2012). "Collective motion". Physics Reports. 517 (3): 71–140. arXiv:1010.5017. Bibcode:2012PhR...517...71V. doi:10.1016/j.physrep.2012.03.004. S2CID 119109873.
