= Mir-279 microRNA precursor family =

mir-279

Identifiers
- Symbol: mir-279
- Rfam: RF00754
- miRBase family: 5

Other data
- RNA type: microRNA
- Domain: Eukaryota;
- PDB structures: PDBe

mir-279 is a short RNA molecule found in Drosophila melanogaster that belongs to a class of molecules known as microRNAs. microRNAs are ~22nt-long non-coding RNAs that post-transcriptionally regulate the expression of genes, often by binding to the 3' untranslated region of mRNA, targeting the transcript for degradation. miR-279 has diverse tissue-specific functions in the fly, influencing developmental processes related to neurogenesis and oogenesis, as well as behavioral processes related to circadian rhythms. The varied roles of mir-279, both in the developing and adult fly, highlight the utility of microRNAs in regulating unique biological processes.

== Function ==
=== Regulation of neuronal cell fate ===
In Drosophila melanogaster the loss of microRNA-279 results in the ectopic formation of CP2 neurons (a type of CO_{2}-sensing neuron) within the maxillary palp, a distal segment in the antenna. The pleiotropic transcription factor Prospero regulates miR-279 expression, and this appears to indirectly restrict CO_{2} neuron formation. Loss of function in either Prospero or miR-270 results in a similar ectopic formation of CO_{2} neurons within the maxillary palp. This is likely results from gain-of-function in the miR-279 target genes nerfin-1 and escargot during olfactory development. This observation highlights how microRNAs regulate pleiotropic neural genes, determining the divergence of sensory systems.

=== Regulation of circadian activity rhythms via unpaired ===
In Drosophila melanogaster, miR-279 influences circadian rhythms by regulating the expression of the cytokine unpaired (upd). Flies with mutant alleles affecting miR-279 fail to maintain robust rest/activity rhythms when housed in free-running conditions (i.e. when they are maintained in the absence of any external cues). Given this phenotype, one might expect miR-279 to directly regulate clock genes within the core-clock neurons. However, this does not appear to be the case. Rather, miR-279 affects the output from core-clock neurons by post-transcriptionally regulating upd, a ligand for JAK/STAT signaling. Because miR-279 regulates upd, which is downstream of the circadian-activated Pigment-Dispersing Factor Receptor, miR-279 indirectly regulates JAK/STAT signaling. Similar to upd, modulating JAK/STAT signaling also affects circadian activity rhythms, suggesting that upd works through JAK/STAT signaling to affect this phenotype.

There is also evidence suggesting that the effect miR-279 on circadian rhythms requires a concurrent loss of function in a similar miRNA, miR-996. Flies with a double mutation for miR-279 and miR-996 have disrupted circadian rhythms, and restoring function in either of these microRNAs appears to restore circadian rhythms to a wild-type level. Given that miR-279 and miR-996 share a similar seed region (i.e. the a short span of nucleotides in the 5' end of the miRNA that determines mRNA specificity), they likely share similar mRNA targets. However, the role miR-996 in regulating upd expression and subsequently JAK/STAT activation has yet to be demonstrated in Drosophila.

=== Regulation of border cell fate via stat ===
Border cells in the ovary of Drosophila melanogaster are set of ~8 migratory cells that support the oocyte during oogenesis. Specifically, these cells migrate from the anterior of the egg chamber toward the posterior, where they ultimately aid in forming a pore for sperm entry. The differentiation of border cells from the static follicular epithelium is set by a morphogen gradient, from the morphogen Unpaired (Upd). Like the aforementioned neuronal Upd, ovarian Upd acts as a ligand for JAK/STAT signaling. Elevated JAK/STAT signaling ensures that cells in the anterior follicular epithelium adopt a migratory border cell fate, whereas diminished JAK/STAT signaling ensures the opposite. miR-279 fine-tunes JAK/STAT signaling in the ovary by negatively regulating stat (unlike the neurons, where it is reported to regulate upd). Loss of function in miR-279 within the Drosophila ovary results in aberrant border cell formation, characterized by an unusually large number of follicular epithelial cells adopting border cell fate. This phenotype, however, can be rescued by diminishing STAT signaling.

== See also ==
- MicroRNA
