= José Mendes (physicist) =

José Fernando F. Mendes
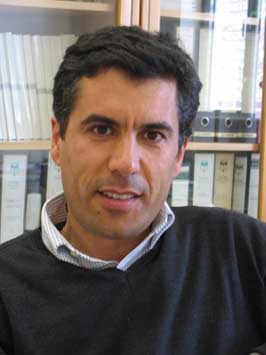
- José Fernando Mendes
- Born: Porto, Portugal
- Education: Universidade do Porto
- Known for: Research of Network theory, Complex networks, Complex systems, scale-free networks, President of the Complex Systems Society
- Awards: Gulbenkian Prize Science, 2004; Fellow of the Network Science Society, 2019; Fellow of the APS (2019); Senior Award Complex Systems Society (2020).
- Scientific career
- Fields: Complex Systems; Complex Networks; Theoretical Physics
- Workplaces: Department of Physics, University of Aveiro
- Doctoral advisor: Eduardo Lage

José Fernando F. Mendes (born in Porto) is a Portuguese physicist (statistical physics) and professor of physics, best known for his work and contributions to the field of network theory. Graduated from University of Porto in 1987. He earned a PhD in March 1995 from the same University under the direction of Eduardo Lage, the title of the thesis was "Dynamics of spin systems".

Mendes was head of the Physics Department from December 2004 to February 2010 at University of Aveiro. From October 2009 to February 2010 he was director of the Associated Laboratory of the Institute of Nanostructures, Nanomodelling and Nanofabrication (I3N) .

From February 2010 to February 2018 served as vice-rector for Research and Doctoral Studies at the University of Aveiro. Was the representative of the Portuguese universities in the Instituto do Petroleo e Gás (Galp) until 2018 .

He has been the President of the Complex Systems Society (2021 - 2024) and Director of the i3N-Aveiro since September 2023 .

== Academic career ==
In 1983 he entered the University of Porto and graduated in physics in 1987. He gained his master's diploma in 1990. In 1987 he was an assistant in the Department of Physics, University of Porto. As a graduate student he visited as several universities as a researcher, including Oxford University, Geneva University, the City University of New York, and São Paulo. After finishing his Ph.D., he became an assistant professor in the same department. In 1996 he did a one year postdoctoral fellowship in Boston University under the supervision of Sid Redner. In 2002 did his "habilitation". In 2002, he became an associate professor at University of Aveiro and in 2005 professor. He was invited as professor by Henri Poincaré University (Nancy), Universidade Federal Minas Gerais (UFMG) and visiting researcher at Consiglio Nazionale Delle Ricerche (Pisa), Nanyang Technological University (NTU), École Polytechnique Fédérale de Lausanne (EPFL-Lausanne) and ETH Zurich (Zurich).

== Awards ==
Member of The Complex Systems Society.
Fellow of the American Physical Society in 2020.
Litoral Awards Prize "Research" (2020)
Senior Prize , Complex Systems Society (2020): "for his seminal contributions and the many further developments of the theory of Complex Networks."

== Selected publications ==
=== Books ===
- S.N. Dorogovtsev and J.F.F. Mendes, "The Nature of Complex Networks", Oxford University Press (2022) ISBN 9780199695119
- G.J. Baxter, R.A. da Costa, S.N. Dorogovtsev, J.F.F. Mendes, "Weak Multiplex Percolation", Cambridge University Press (2021) ISBN 9781108865777
- Dorogovtsev, SN and Mendes JFF, Evolution of Networks: From Biological Nets to the Internet and WWW, Oxford University Press, Oxford 2003, 2014; ISBN 9780198515906 (hardcover)

=== Articles ===
- S. N. Dorogovtsev, J. F. F. Mendes (2002). "Evolution of networks". Advances in Physics. 51 (4): 1079–1187. arXiv:cond-mat/0106144. Bibcode:2002AdPhy..51.1079D. doi:10.1080/00018730110112519. S2CID 429546.
- S. N. Dorogovtsev, A. V. Goltsev, J. F. F. Mendes (2008). "Critical phenomena in complex networks". Rev. Mod. Phys. 80 (4): 1275–1335. arXiv:0705.0010. Bibcode:2008RvMP...80.1275D. doi:10.1103/RevModPhys.80.1275. S2CID 3174463.
- R. A. da Costa, S. N. Dorogovtsev, A. V. Goltsev, J. F. F. Mendes, "Explosive Percolation" Transition is Actually Continuous, Phys. Rev. Lett. 105, 255701 (2010)
