= Active fluid =

An active fluid is a densely packed soft material whose constituent elements can directly inject and dissipate energy. Examples include dense suspensions of bacteria, microtubule networks or artificial swimmers. These materials come under the broad category of active matter and differ significantly in properties when compared to passive fluids, which can be described using Navier-Stokes equation. Even though systems describable as active fluids have been observed and investigated in different contexts for a long time, scientific interest in properties directly related to the activity has emerged only in the past two decades. These materials have been shown to exhibit a variety of different phases ranging from well ordered patterns to chaotic states (see below). Recent experimental investigations have suggested that the various dynamical phases exhibited by active fluids may have important technological applications.

== Terminology ==
The terms "active fluids", "active nematics" and "active liquid crystals" have been used almost synonymously to denote hydrodynamic descriptions of dense active matter. While in many respects they describe the same phenomenon, there are subtle differences between them. "Active nematics" and "active liquid crystals" refers to systems where the constituent elements have nematic order whereas "active fluids" is the more generic term combining systems with both nematic and polar interactions.

== Examples and observations ==
There are wide range of cellular and intracellular elements which form active fluids. This include systems of microtubule, bacteria, sperm cells as well as inanimate microswimmers. It is known that these systems form a variety of structures such as regular and irregular lattices as well as seemingly random states in two dimensions.

=== Pattern formation ===
Active fluids have been shown to organize into regular and irregular lattices in a variety of settings. These include irregular hexagonal lattices by microtubules and regular vortex lattice by sperm cells. From topological considerations, it can be seen that the constituent element in quasi stationary states of active fluids should necessarily be vortices. But very less is known, for instance, about the length scale selection in such systems.

=== Active turbulence ===
Chaotic states exhibited by active fluids are termed as active turbulence. Such states are qualitatively similar to hydrodynamic turbulence, by virtue of which they are termed active turbulence. But recent research has indicated that the statistical properties associated with such flows are quite different from that of hydrodynamic turbulence.

== Mechanism and modelling approaches ==
The mechanism behind the formation of various structures in active fluids is an area of active research. It is well understood that the structure formation in active fluids is intimately related to defects or disclinations in the order parameter field (the orientational order of the constituent agents). An important part of research on active fluids involve modelling of dynamics of these defects to study its role in pattern formation and turbulent dynamics in active fluids. Modified versions of Vicsek model are among earliest and continually used approach to model active fluids. Such models have been shown to capture the various dynamical states exhibited by active fluids. More refined approaches include derivation of continuum limit hydrodynamic equations for active fluids and adaptation of liquid crystal theory by including the activity terms.

== Potential applications ==
A few technological applications for active fluids have been proposed such as powering of molecular motors through active turbulence and patterned state. Furthermore, given the innumerable applications liquid crystals find in various technologies, there have been proposals to augment them by using active liquid crystals.

== See also ==
- Active matter
- Vicsek model
- Navier–Stokes equations
- Soft matter
