= Tamás Vicsek =

Hungarian scientist, physicist (born 1948)

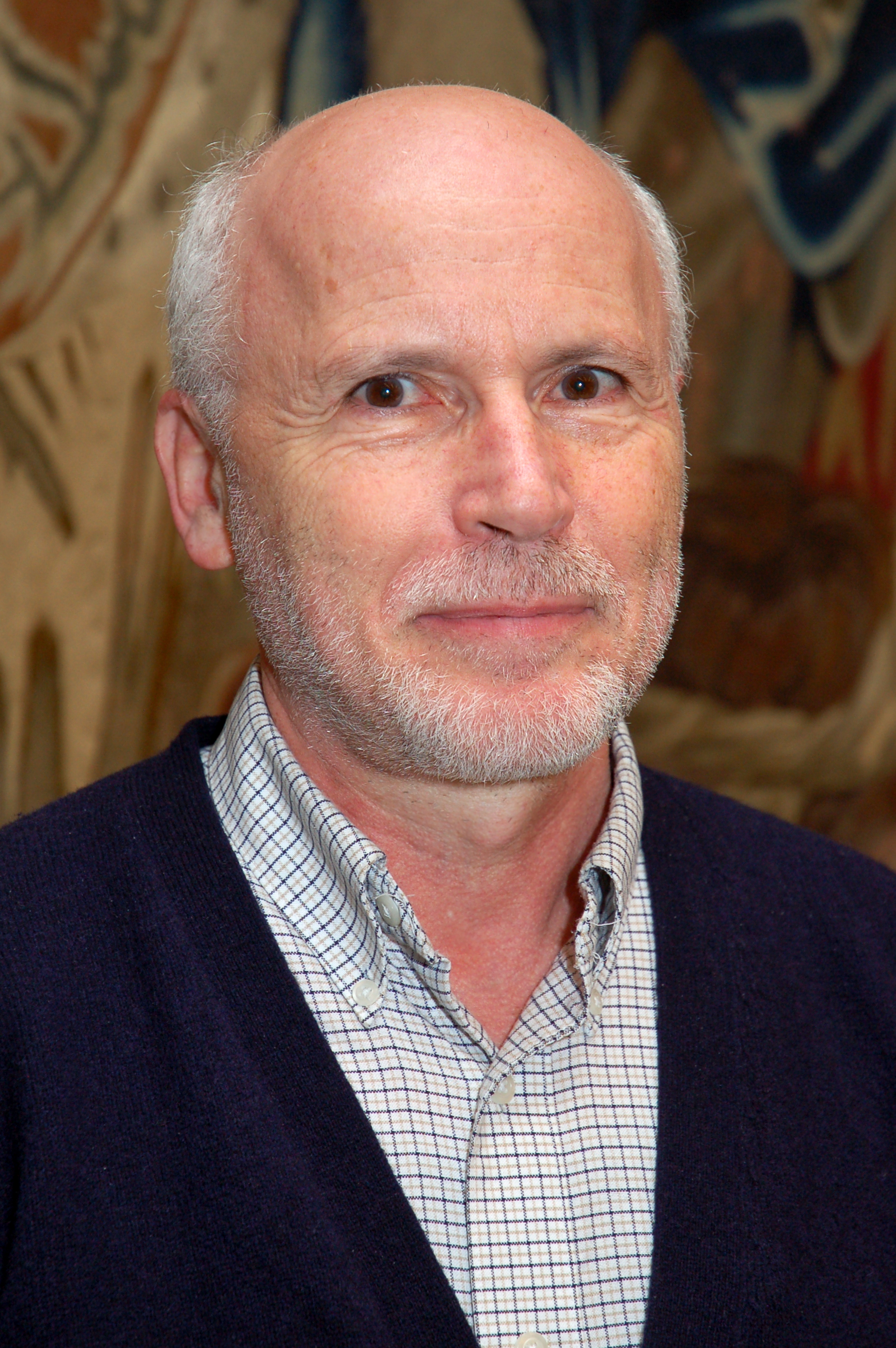
- Vicsek in 2011
- Born: 10 May 1948 (age 76); Budapest, Hungary
- Education: Lomonosov University(M.Sc.) Lajos Kossuth University(Ph.D.)
- Alma mater: Lajos Kossuth University
- Known for: Vicsek fractal Vicsek model Family–Vicsek scaling Barabási–Ravasz–Vicsek model
- Spouse: Mária Streho
- Scientific career
- Fields: Physics, Network Science
- Institutions: Eötvös Loránd University
- Thesis: (1976)
- Notable students: Albert-László Barabási
- Website: hal.elte.hu/~vicsek

Tamás Vicsek (Hungarian pronunciation: [ˈtɒmaːʃ ˈvit͡ʃɛk], born 10 May 1948, Budapest) is a Hungarian scientist with research interests in numerical studies of dense liquids, percolation theory, Monte Carlo simulation of cluster models, aggregation phenomena, fractal growth, pattern formation (computer and laboratory experiments), collective phenomena in biological systems (flocking, oscillations, crowds), molecular motors, cell locomotion in vitro. He held the position of professor of physics at the Eötvös Loránd University, Budapest, Hungary, and was visiting scientists in various academia.

He is the namesake of the Vicsek fractal and the Vicsek model of swarm behavior.

He earned M.Sc. from the Lomonosov University, Moscow in 1972 and PhD from Lajos Kossuth University (current University of Debrecen) in 1976.

== Awards and recognition ==
- 1990 Award of the Hungarian Academy of Sciences
- 1999 Széchenyi Prize
- 2003 Leo Szilard Award (hu:Szilárd Leó professzori ösztöndíj)
- 2006 Fellow of the American Physical Society
- 2020 Lars Onsager Prize (US)
