= Soft matter =

Subfield of condensed matter physics

Soft matter or soft condensed matter is a type of matter that can be deformed or structurally altered by thermal or mechanical stress which is of similar magnitude to thermal fluctuations.

The science of soft matter is a subfield of condensed matter physics. Soft materials include liquids, colloids, polymers, foams, gels, granular materials, liquid crystals, flesh, and a number of biomaterials. These materials share an important common feature in that predominant physical behaviors occur at an energy scale comparable with room temperature thermal energy (of order of kT), and that entropy is considered the dominant factor. At these temperatures, quantum aspects are generally unimportant. When soft materials interact favorably with surfaces, they become squashed without an external compressive force.

Pierre-Gilles de Gennes, who has been called the "founding father of soft matter," received the Nobel Prize in Physics in 1991 for discovering that methods developed for studying order phenomena in simple systems can be generalized to the more complex cases found in soft matter, in particular, to the behaviors of liquid crystals and polymers.

== History ==
The current understanding of soft matter grew from Albert Einstein's work on Brownian motion, understanding that a particle suspended in a fluid must have a similar thermal energy to the fluid itself (of order of kT). This work built on established research into systems that would now be considered colloids.

The crystalline optical properties of liquid crystals and their ability to flow were first described by Friedrich Reinitzer in 1888, and further characterized by Otto Lehmann in 1889. The experimental setup that Lehmann used to investigate the two melting points of cholesteryl benzoate are still used in the research of liquid crystals as of about 2019.

In 1920, Hermann Staudinger, recipient of the 1953 Nobel Prize in Chemistry, was the first person to suggest that polymers are formed through covalent bonds that link smaller molecules together. The idea of a macromolecule was unheard of at the time, with the scientific consensus being that the recorded high molecular weights of compounds like natural rubber were instead due to particle aggregation.

The use of hydrogel in the biomedical field was pioneered in 1960 by Drahoslav Lím and Otto Wichterle. Together, they postulated that the chemical stability, ease of deformation, and permeability of certain polymer networks in aqueous environments would have a significant impact on medicine, and were the inventors of the soft contact lens.

These seemingly separate fields were dramatically influenced and brought together by Pierre-Gilles de Gennes. The work of de Gennes across different forms of soft matter was key to understanding its universality, where material properties are not based on the chemistry of the underlying structure, more so on the mesoscopic structures the underlying chemistry creates. He extended the understanding of phase changes in liquid crystals, introduced the idea of reptation regarding the relaxation of polymer systems, and successfully mapped polymer behavior to that of the Ising model.

== Distinctive physics ==
The self-assembly of individual phospholipids into colloids (Liposome and Micelle) or a membrane (bilayer sheet).

Interesting behaviors arise from soft matter in ways that cannot be predicted, or are difficult to predict, directly from its atomic or molecular constituents. Materials termed soft matter exhibit this property due to a shared propensity of these materials to self-organize into mesoscopic physical structures. The assembly of the mesoscale structures that form the macroscale material is governed by low energies, and these low energy associations allow for the thermal and mechanical deformation of the material. By way of contrast, in hard condensed matter physics it is often possible to predict the overall behavior of a material because the molecules are organized into a crystalline lattice with no changes in the pattern at any mesoscopic scale. Unlike hard materials, where only small distortions occur from thermal or mechanical agitation, soft matter can undergo local rearrangements of the microscopic building blocks.

A defining characteristic of soft matter is the mesoscopic scale of physical structures. The structures are much larger than the microscopic scale (the arrangement of atoms and molecules), and yet are much smaller than the macroscopic (overall) scale of the material. The properties and interactions of these mesoscopic structures may determine the macroscopic behavior of the material. The large number of constituents forming these mesoscopic structures, and the large degrees of freedom this causes, results in a general disorder between the large-scale structures. This disorder leads to the loss of long-range order that is characteristic of hard matter.

For example, the turbulent vortices that naturally occur within a flowing liquid are much smaller than the overall quantity of liquid and yet much larger than its individual molecules, and the emergence of these vortices controls the overall flowing behavior of the material. Also, the bubbles that compose a foam are mesoscopic because they individually consist of a vast number of molecules, and yet the foam itself consists of a great number of these bubbles, and the overall mechanical stiffness of the foam emerges from the combined interactions of the bubbles.

Typical bond energies in soft matter structures are of similar scale to thermal energies. Therefore the structures are constantly affected by thermal fluctuations and undergo Brownian motion. The ease of deformation and influence of low energy interactions regularly result in slow dynamics of the mesoscopic structures which allows some systems to remain out of equilibrium in metastable states. This characteristic can allow for recovery of initial state through an external stimulus, which is often exploited in research.

Self-assembly is an inherent characteristic of soft matter systems. The characteristic complex behavior and hierarchical structures arise spontaneously as a system evolves towards equilibrium. Self-assembly can be classified as static when the resulting structure is due to a free energy minimum, or dynamic when the system is caught in a metastable state. Dynamic self-assembly can be utilized in the functional design of soft materials with these metastable states through kinetic trapping.

Soft materials often exhibit both elasticity and viscous responses to external stimuli such as shear induced flow or phase transitions. However, excessive external stimuli often result in nonlinear responses. Soft matter becomes highly deformed before crack propagation, which differs significantly from the general fracture mechanics formulation. Rheology, the study of deformation under stress, is often used to investigate the bulk properties of soft matter.

== Classes of soft matter ==
A portion of the DNA double helix, an example of a biopolymer.

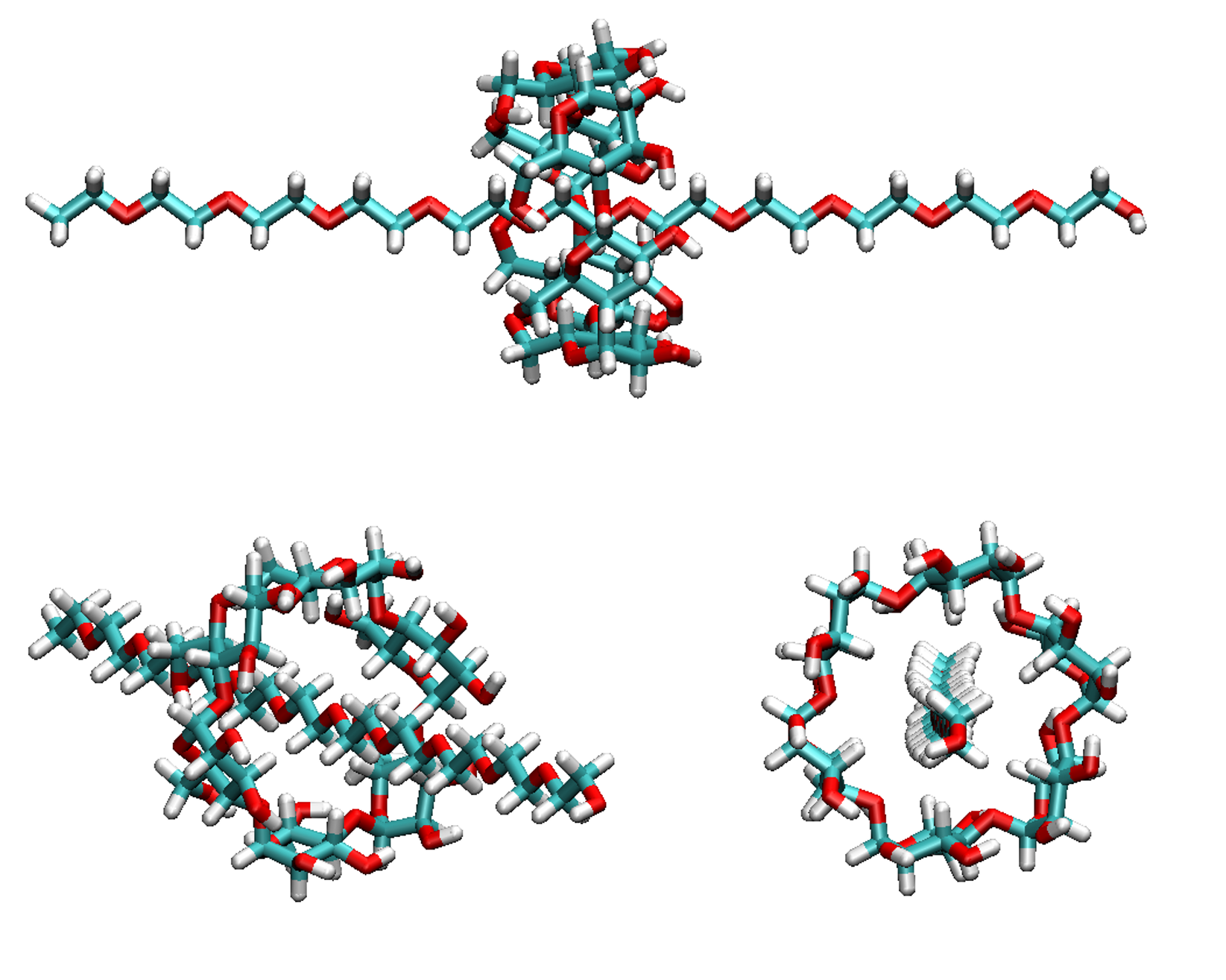
Host-guest complex of polyethylene glycol oligomer bound within an α-cyclodextrin molecule; a common scaffold used in the formation of gels. The atoms are colored such that red represents oxygen, cyan represents carbon, and white represents hydrogen.

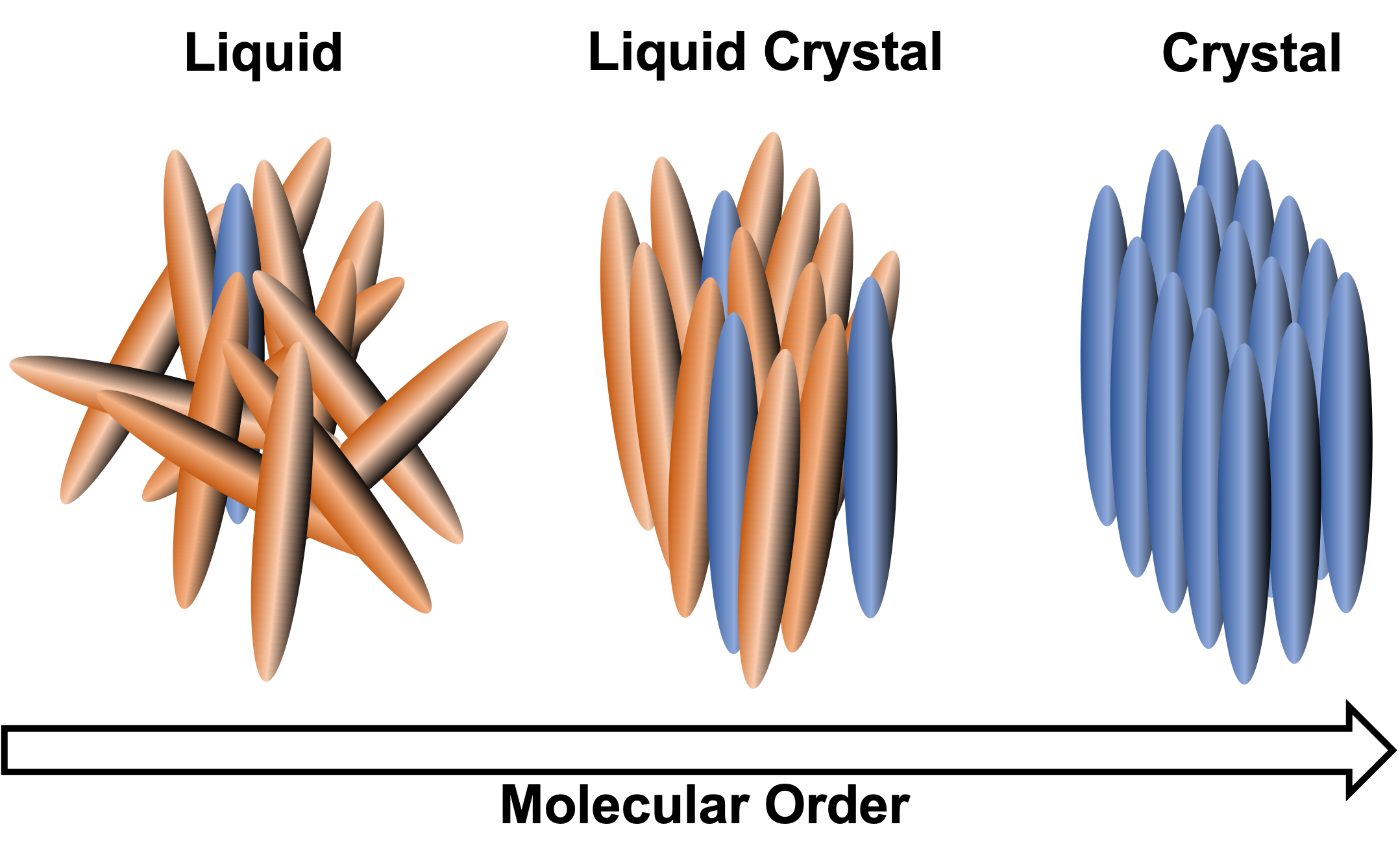
Cartoon representation of the molecular order of crystal, liquid crystal, and liquid states.

Soft matter consists of a diverse range of interrelated systems and can be broadly categorized into certain classes. These classes are by no means distinct, as often there are overlaps between two or more groups.

=== Polymers ===
Polymers are large molecules composed of repeating subunits whose characteristics are governed by their environment and composition. Polymers encompass synthetic plastics, natural fibers and rubbers, and biological proteins. Polymer research finds applications in nanotechnology, from materials science and drug delivery to protein crystallization.

=== Foams ===
Foams consist of a liquid or solid through which a gas has been dispersed to form cavities. This structure imparts a large surface-area-to-volume ratio on the system. Foams have found applications in insulation and textiles, and are undergoing active research in the biomedical field of drug delivery and tissue engineering. Foams are also used in automotive for water and dust sealing and noise reduction.

=== Gels ===
Gels consist of non-solvent-soluble 3D polymer scaffolds, which are covalently or physically cross-linked, that have a high solvent/content ratio. Research into functionalizing gels that are sensitive to mechanical and thermal stress, as well as solvent choice, has given rise to diverse structures with characteristics such as shape-memory, or the ability to bind guest molecules selectively and reversibly.

=== Colloids ===
Colloids are non-soluble particles suspended in a medium, such as proteins in an aqueous solution. Research into colloids is primarily focused on understanding the organization of matter, with the large structures of colloids, relative to individual molecules, large enough that they can be readily observed.

=== Liquid crystals ===
Liquid crystals can consist of proteins, small molecules, or polymers, that can be manipulated to form cohesive order in a specific direction. They exhibit liquid-like behavior in that they can flow, yet they can obtain close-to-crystal alignment. One feature of liquid crystals is their ability to spontaneously break symmetry. Liquid crystals have found significant applications in optical devices such as liquid-crystal displays (LCD).

=== Biological membranes ===
Biological membranes consist of individual phospholipid molecules that have self-assembled into a bilayer structure due to non-covalent interactions. The localized, low energy associated with the forming of the membrane allows for the elastic deformation of the large-scale structure.

== Experimental characterization ==
Due to the importance of mesoscale structures in the overarching properties of soft matter, experimental work is primarily focused on the bulk properties of the materials. Rheology is often used to investigate the physical changes of the material under stress. Biological systems, such as protein crystallization, are often investigated through X-ray and neutron crystallography, while nuclear magnetic resonance spectroscopy can be used in understanding the average structure and lipid mobility of membranes.

=== Scattering ===
Scattering techniques, such as wide-angle X-ray scattering, small-angle X-ray scattering, neutron scattering, and dynamic light scattering can also be used for materials when probing for the average properties of the constituents. These methods can determine particle-size distribution, shape, crystallinity and diffusion of the constituents in the system. There are limitations in the application of scattering techniques to some systems, as they can be more suited to isotropic and dilute samples.

=== Computational ===
Computational methods are often employed to model and understand soft matter systems, as they have the ability to strictly control the composition and environment of the structures being investigated, as well as span from microscopic to macroscopic length scales. Computational methods are limited, however, by their suitability to the system and must be regularly validated against experimental results to ensure accuracy. The use of informatics in the prediction of soft matter properties is also a growing field in computer science thanks to the large amount of data available for soft matter systems.

=== Microscopy ===
Optical microscopy can be used in the study of colloidal systems, but more advanced methods like transmission electron microscopy (TEM) and atomic force microscopy (AFM) are often used to characterize forms of soft matter due to their applicability to mapping systems at the nanoscale. These imaging techniques are not universally appropriate to all classes of soft matter and some systems may be more suited to one kind of analysis than another. For example, there are limited applications in imaging hydrogels with TEM due to the processes required for imaging. However, fluorescence microscopy can be readily applied. Liquid crystals are often probed using polarized light microscopy to determine the ordering of the material under various conditions, such as temperature or electric field.

== Applications ==
Soft materials are important in a wide range of technological applications, and each soft material can often be associated with multiple disciplines. Liquid crystals, for example, were originally discovered in the biological sciences when the botanist and chemist Friedrich Reinitzer was investigating cholesterols. Now, however, liquid crystals have also found applications as liquid-crystal displays, liquid crystal tunable filters, and liquid crystal thermometers. Active liquid crystals are another example of soft materials, where the constituent elements in liquid crystals can self-propel.

Polymers have found diverse applications, from the natural rubber found in latex gloves to the vulcanized rubber found in tires. Polymers encompass a large range of soft matter, with applications in material science. An example of this is hydrogel. With the ability to undergo shear thinning, hydrogels are well suited for the development of 3D printing. Due to their stimuli responsive behavior, 3D printing of hydrogels has found applications in a diverse range of fields, such as soft robotics, tissue engineering, and flexible electronics. Polymers also encompass biological molecules such as proteins, where research insights from soft matter research have been applied to better understand topics like protein crystallization.

3D/4D printing of soft materials is evolving, focusing on various printing techniques, material types, and their broad applications in engineering and technology. Key printing methods are extrusion and inkjet based printing, stereolithography, selective laser sintering, direct ink writing, and VAT photopolymerization. A diversity in soft materials for 3D/4D printing includes elastomers, hydrogels, bio-inspired polymers, conductive and flexible materials, andinkjet-based biomimetic materials for applications in biomedical engineering, soft robotics, wearable devices, textiles, food technology, and pharmaceuticals. Changelings and limitations prevail in design geometric complexity,cost, resolution, material #compatibility, scalability and regulatory concerns.

Foams can naturally occur, such as the head on a beer, or be created intentionally, such as by fire extinguishers. The physical properties available to foams have resulted in applications which can be based on their viscosity, with more rigid and self-supporting forms of foams being used as insulation or cushions, and foams that exhibit the ability to flow being used in the cosmetic industry as shampoos or makeup. Foams have also found biomedical applications in tissue engineering as scaffolds and biosensors.

Historically the problems considered in the early days of soft matter science were those pertaining to the biological sciences. As such, an important application of soft matter research is biophysics, with a major goal of the discipline being the reduction of the field of cell biology to the concepts of soft matter physics. Applications of soft matter characteristics are used to understand biologically relevant topics such as membrane mobility, as well as the rheology of blood.

== See also ==
- Biological membranes
- Biomaterials
- Colloids
- Complex fluids
- Foams
- Fracture of soft materials
- Gels
- Granular materials
- Liquids
- Liquid crystals
- Microemulsions
- Polymers
- Protein dynamics
- Protein structure
- Surfactants
- Active matter
- Roughness
