= Border cells (Drosophila) =

The border cells are a cluster of 6–8 cells that migrate in the ovariole of the fruit-fly Drosophila melanogaster, during the process of oogenesis. A fly ovary consists of a string of ovarioles or egg chambers arranged in an increasing order of maturity. Each egg chamber contains 16 central germline, nurse cells surrounded by a monolayer epithelium of nearly 1000 follicle cells. At stage 8 of oogenesis, these cells initiate invading the neighbouring nurse cells, and reach the oocyte boundary by Stage 10.

== Mechanism of action ==
The border cells are specified by the activation of the JAK-STAT pathway in response to the cytokine, Unpaired. The signaling initiates by binding of Unpaired ligand to the Domeless receptor. The migratory fate is acquired by the activation of slbo, a transcription factor that leads to the transformation of stationary follicle cells into the migratory border cell fate by regulating the expression of various genes. Once the cluster detaches from the anterior end of the ovariole, a gradient of chemokines, PDGF and VEGF (PVF1) aids in the directional migration of border cells towards the oocyte. The timing of the border cell migration along with egg chamber development is coordinated by ecdysone, a steroid hormone, which functions through Taiman, ecdysone receptor and ultraspiracle receptors. These cells migrate as a free group by means of transient cell-cell adhesions, further initiating signaling cascades that regulate expression of cytoskeletal components and triggers cellular extensions enabling forward movement. The invasive movement of the cluster towards the posteriorly located oocyte is followed by the off-centred movement towards the dorsal side of the egg chamber. The second kind of movement is mediated by the binding of Gurken, Spitz and Keren ligands to the EGFR on the border cells.

== Significance ==
The directional and collective migration of border cells aids in the formation of micropyle, a specialised passage through which the sperm enters during fertilisation. Studying cell migration is important from the point of view of metastasis, and for this reason, several model organisms are used to determine what molecules are important in initiating, maintaining and guiding moving cells. Drosophila melanogaster is one of the favorite organisms for studying biological phenomena. The border cells of the Drosophila ovary are a genetically tractable system for studying diverse aspects of migrating phenotype. After identifying the genes that are important for this phenotype, their homologs can be investigated for putative roles in turning non-invasive cancerous tumors into metastatic ones.
