= Active matter =

Matter behavior at system scale

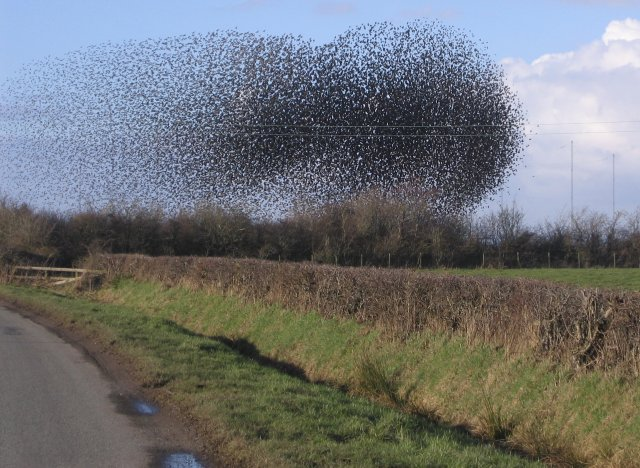
A flock of starlings acting as a swarm

Active matter is matter composed of large numbers of active "agents", each of which consumes energy in order to move or to exert mechanical forces. Such systems are intrinsically out of thermal equilibrium. Unlike thermal systems relaxing towards equilibrium and systems with boundary conditions imposing steady currents, active matter systems break time reversal symmetry because energy is being continually dissipated by the individual constituents. Most examples of active matter are biological in origin and span all the scales of the living, from bacteria and self-organising bio-polymers such as microtubules and actin (both of which are part of the cytoskeleton of living cells), to schools of fish and flocks of birds. However, a great deal of current experimental work is devoted to synthetic systems such as artificial self-propelled particles. Active matter is a relatively new material classification in soft matter: the most extensively studied model, the Vicsek model, dates from 1995.

Research in active matter combines analytical techniques, numerical simulations and experiments. Notable analytical approaches include hydrodynamics, kinetic theory, and non-equilibrium statistical physics. Numerical studies mainly involve self-propelled-particles models, making use of agent-based models such as molecular dynamics algorithms or lattice-gas models, as well as computational studies of hydrodynamic equations of active fluids. Experiments on biological systems extend over a wide range of scales, including animal groups (e.g., bird flocks, mammalian herds, fish schools and insect swarms), bacterial colonies, cellular tissues (e.g. epithelial tissue layers, cancer growth and embryogenesis), cytoskeleton components (e.g., in vitro motility assays, actin-myosin networks and molecular-motor driven filaments). Experiments on synthetic systems include self-propelled colloids (e.g., phoretically propelled particles), driven granular matter (e.g. vibrated monolayers), swarming robots, and Quincke rotators.

Since the 1990s, research on active matter has been growing fast. It is performed by different scientific communities and divided into several subdisciplines. Multiple new review articles addressing particular subdisciplines and topics in the field of active matter are published each year. While there have been 0-10 new review articles per year in 1990-2010 on active matter, the number has grown to 10-100 review articles per year in 2011-2020 and to 100-140 in 2021-2024. A first metareview article giving an overview about the existing more than 1000 review articles in this field has been published in 2025.

== Concepts ==
- Active gels
  - Dense active matter
- Collective motion
  - Collective animal behavior
  - Collective cell migration
- Motility induced phase separation
- Schooling, flocking and swarming
- Active stress
- Disordered hyperuniformity

== Systems ==
- Biological tissues
  - Subcellular and cell mechanics
- Crowd behaviour
- Self-propelled particles and colloids
