= Soret =

Soret may refer to:

== Persons ==
- Charles Soret (1854–1904), a chemist, and son of Jacques-Louis Soret
  - Thermophoresis, also known (particularly in liquid mixtures) as the Soret effect, named for him
- Frédéric Soret (1795–1865), a physicist and numismatist
- Jacques-Louis Soret (1827–1890), a chemist, and father of Charles Soret
  - the Soret peak, a spectroscopic phenomenon named for him
- Julien Soret, French governor of Senegal (1837–1839)
- Nicolas Soret, 17th-century playwright

== Locations ==
- Fontaine-la-Soret, a commune in France
