= Clustering of self-propelled particles =

Tendency of self-propelled particles to aggregate and form clusters

Many experimental realizations of self-propelled particles exhibit a strong tendency to aggregate and form clusters, whose dynamics are much richer than those of passive colloids. These aggregates of particles form for a variety of reasons, from chemical gradients to magnetic and ultrasonic fields. Self-propelled enzyme motors and synthetic nanomotors also exhibit clustering effects in the form of chemotaxis. Chemotaxis is a form of collective motion of biological or non-biological particles toward a fuel source or away from a threat, as observed experimentally in enzyme diffusion and also synthetic chemotaxis or phototaxis. In addition to irreversible schooling, self-propelled particles also display reversible collective motion, such as predator–prey behavior and oscillatory clustering and dispersion.

== Phenomenology ==
This clustering behavior has been observed for self-propelled Janus particles, either platinum-coated gold particles or carbon-coated silica beads, and for magnetically or ultrasonically powered particles. Clustering has also been observed for colloidal particles composed of either an embedded hematite cube or slowly-diffusing metal ions. Autonomous aggregation has also been observed in anatase TiO_{2} (titanium dioxide) particles. Clustering also occurs in enzyme molecule diffusion. Recently, enzymes such as hexokinase and alkaline phosphatase were found to aggregate in the presence of their substrates. In all these experiments, the motion of particles takes place on a two-dimensional surface and clustering is seen for area fractions as low as 10%. For such low area fractions, the clusters have a finite mean size while at larger area fractions (30% or higher), a complete phase separation has been reported. The dynamics of the finite-size clusters are very rich, exhibiting either crystalline order or amorphous packing. The finite size of the clusters comes from a balance between attachment of new particles to pre-existing clusters and breakdown of large clusters into smaller ones, which has led to the term "living clusters".

== Mechanism for synthetic systems ==
The precise mechanism leading to the appearance of clusters is not completely elucidated and is a current field of research for many systems. A few different mechanisms have been proposed, which could be at play in different experimental setups.

Self-propelled particles can accumulate in a region of space where they move with a decreased velocity. After accumulation, in regions of high particle density, the particles move more slowly because of steric hindrance. A feedback between these two mechanisms can lead to the so-called motility induced phase separation. This phase separation can, however, be arrested by chemically-mediated inter-particle torques or hydrodynamic interactions, which could explain the formation of finite-size clusters. Self-propelled particles spinning at intermediate Reynolds numbers exhibit flocking, chiral active phases, and clustering, highlighting the role of fluid inertia and rotational motion in active matter behavior.

Alternatively, clustering and phase-separation could be due to the presence of inter-particle attractive forces, as in equilibrium suspensions. Active forces would then oppose this phase separation by pulling apart the particles in the cluster, following two main processes. First, single particles can exist independently if their propulsion forces are sufficient to escape from the cluster. Secondly, a large cluster can break into smaller pieces due to the build-up of internal stress: as more and more particles enter the cluster, their propulsive forces add up until they break down its cohesion.

Diffusiophoresis is also a commonly cited mechanism for clustering and collective behavior, involving the attraction or repulsion of particles to each other in response to ion gradients. Diffusiophoresis is a process involving the gradients of electrolyte or non-electrolyte concentrations interacting with charged (electrophoretic interactions) or neutral (chemophoretic interactions) particles in solution and with the double layer of any walls or surfaces (electroosmotic interactions).

In experiments, arguments have been put forward in favor of any of the above mechanisms. For carbon-coated silica beads, attractive interactions are seemingly negligible and phase-separation is indeed seen at large densities. For other experimental systems, however, attractive forces often play a larger role.

== See also ==
- Active Brownian particle – Model of self-propelled motion in a dissipative environment
- Self-propelled particles – Type of autonomous agent
