= 2024 French legislative election in Yonne =

Following the first round of the 2024 French legislative election on 30 June 2024, runoff elections in each constituency where no candidate received a vote share greater than 50 percent were scheduled for 7 July. Candidates permitted to stand in the runoff elections needed to either come in first or second place in the first round or achieve more than 12.5 percent of the votes of the entire electorate (as opposed to 12.5 percent of the vote share due to low turnout).

== Yonne ==
=== 1st constituency ===
Candidate	Party or alliance		First round		Second round	
Candidate	Party or alliance		Votes	%	Votes	%
Daniel Grenon	National Rally		20,486	40.40	23,737	51.38
Florence Loury	New Popular Front	The Ecologists	12,851	25.34	22,459	48.62
Victor Albrecht	Ensemble	Renaissance	8,871	17.49		
Céline Bähr	Miscellaneous right	The Republicans	7,303	14.40		
Sylvie Manigaut	Far-left	Lutte Ouvrière	654	1.29		
Jean-Christophe Letierce	Reconquête		542	1.07		
Total			50,707	100.00	46,196	100.00
Valid votes			50,707	97.52	46,196	89.57
Invalid votes			357	0.69	1,114	2.16
Blank votes			933	1.79	4,267	8.27
Total votes			51,997	100.00	51,577	100.00
Registered voters/turnout			74,973	69.35	74,976	68.79

=== 2nd constituency ===
Candidate	Party or alliance		First round		Second round	
Candidate	Party or alliance		Votes	%	Votes	%
Sophie-Laurence Roy	Union of the far right	The Republicans	20,997	44.51	23,736	50.42
André Villiers	Ensemble	Horizons	13,837	29.33	23,342	49.58
Philippe Veyssière	New Popular Front	La France Insoumise	9,197	19.50		
Iris Nakov	Ecologists	Independent	1,019	2.16		
Thomas Verhegge	Sovereigntist right	Debout la France	895	1.90		
Sylvie Demussy	Reconquête		620	1.31		
Anita Carrasco	Far-left	Lutte Ouvrière	608	1.29		
Total			47,173	100.00	47,078	100.00
Valid votes			47,173	96.59	47,078	95.37
Invalid votes			649	1.33	624	1.26
Blank votes			1,015	2.08	1,664	3.37
Total votes			48,837	100.00	49,366	100.00
Registered voters/turnout			72,260	67.59	72,260	68.32

=== 3rd constituency ===
Candidate	Party or alliance		Votes	%
Julien Odoul	National Rally		28,735	50.44
Nicolas Soret	New Popular Front	Socialist Party	14,530	25.51
Michèle Crouzet	Ensemble	Democratic Movement	9,973	17.51
Grégoire Weigel	Miscellaneous right	Independent	2,271	3.99
Annik Vilbois	Reconquête		568	1.00
Simonne Pallant	Far-left	Lutte Ouvrière	541	0.95
Jean-Charles Kermin	Far-left	Miscellaneous left	350	0.61
Total			56,968	100.00
Valid votes			56,968	97.37
Invalid votes			483	0.83
Blank votes			1,053	1.80
Total votes			58,504	100.00
Registered voters/turnout			89,716	65.21
