= Squirmer =

Model in fluid dynamics

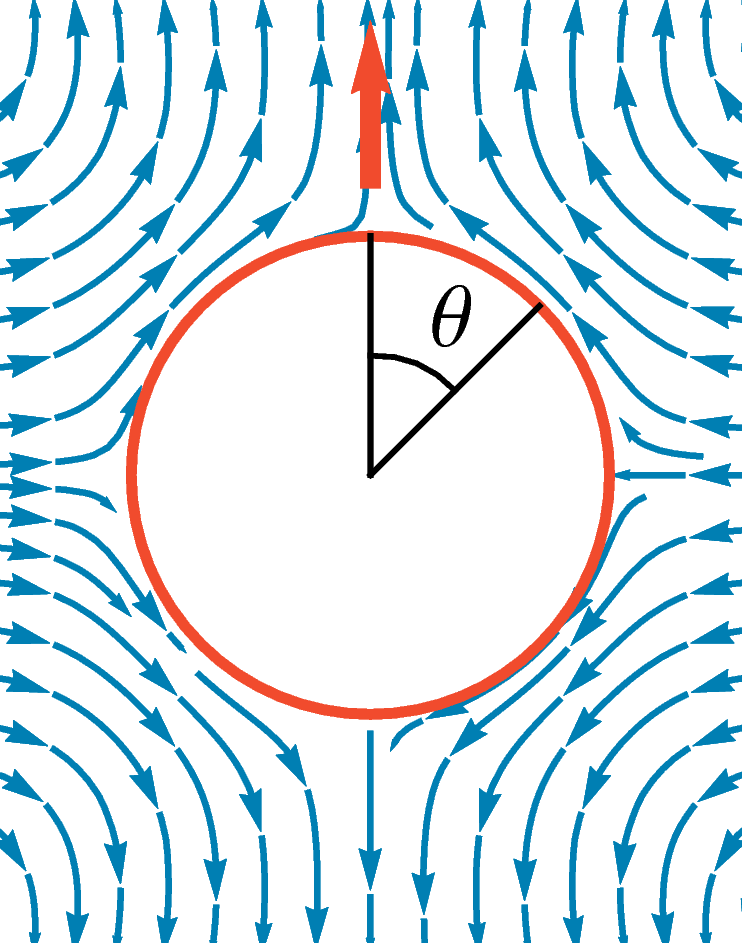
Spherical microswimmer in Stokes flow

The squirmer is a model for a spherical microswimmer swimming in Stokes flow. The squirmer model was introduced by James Lighthill in 1952 and refined and used to model Paramecium by John Blake in 1971. Blake used the squirmer model to describe the flow generated by a carpet of beating short filaments called cilia on the surface of Paramecium. Today, the squirmer is a standard model for the study of self-propelled particles, such as Janus particles, in Stokes flow.

== Velocity field in particle frame ==
Here we give the flow field of a squirmer in the case of a non-deformable axisymmetric spherical squirmer (radius $R$). These expressions are given in a spherical coordinate system.

$u_r(r,\theta)=\frac 2 3 \left(\frac{R^3}{r^3} -1\right)B_1P_1(\cos\theta)+\sum_{n=2}^{\infty}\left(\frac{R^{n+2}}{r^{n+2}}-\frac{R^n}{r^n}\right)B_nP_n(\cos\theta)\;,$
$u_{\theta}(r,\theta)=\frac 2 3 \left(\frac{R^3}{2r^3}+1\right)B_1V_1(\cos\theta)+\sum_{n=2}^{\infty}\frac 1 2\left(n\frac{R^{n+2}}{r^{n+2}}+(2-n)\frac{R^n}{r^n}\right)B_nV_n(\cos\theta)\;.$

Here $B_n$ are constant coefficients, $P_n(\cos\theta)$ are Legendre polynomials, and $V_n(\cos\theta)=\frac{-2}{n(n+1)}\partial_{\theta}P_n(\cos\theta)$.
One finds $P_1(\cos\theta)=\cos\theta, P_2(\cos\theta)=\tfrac 1 2 (3\cos^2\theta-1), \dots, V_1(\cos\theta)=\sin\theta, V_2(\cos\theta)= \tfrac{1}{2} \sin 2\theta, \dots$.
The expressions above are in the frame of the moving particle. At the interface one finds $u_{\theta}(R,\theta)=\sum_{n=1}^{\infty} B_nV_n$ and $u_r(R,\theta)=0$.

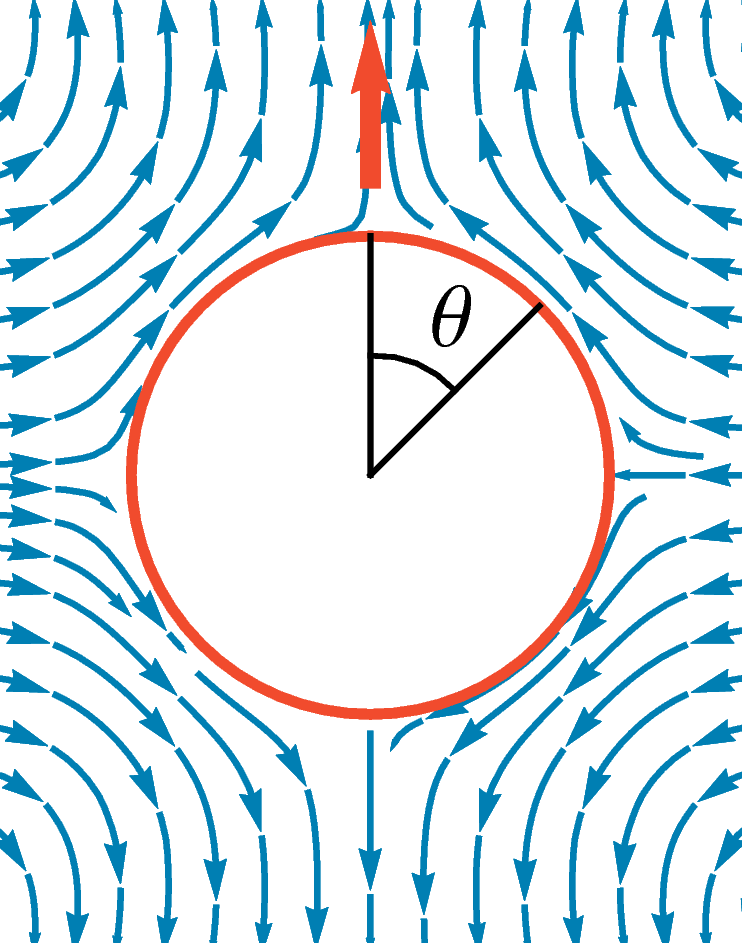
Shaker, $\beta=-\infty$

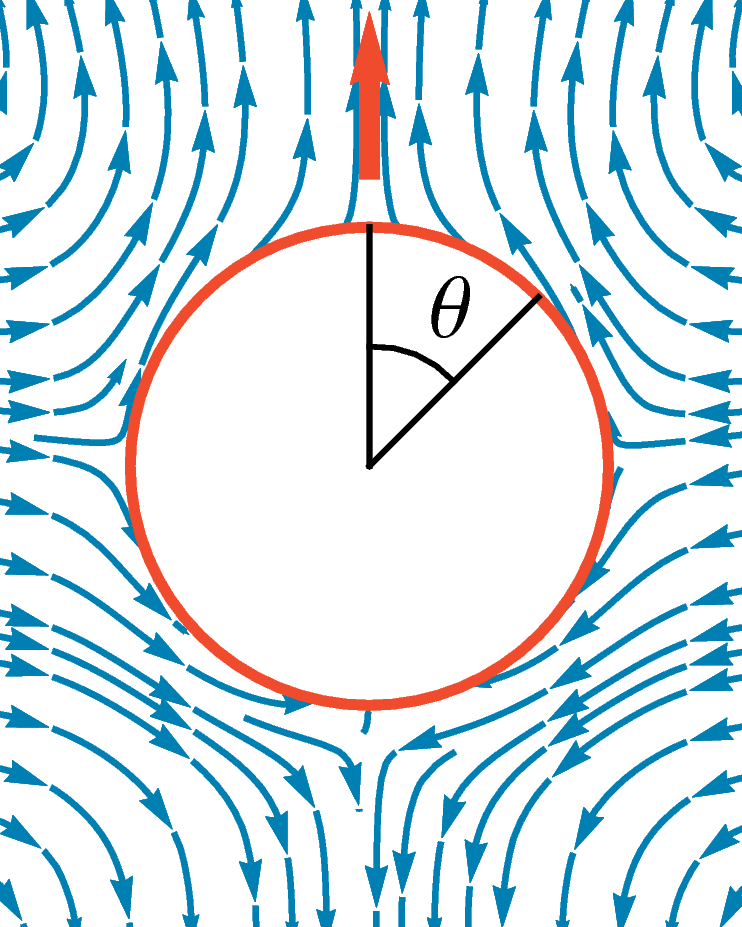
Pusher, $\beta=-5$

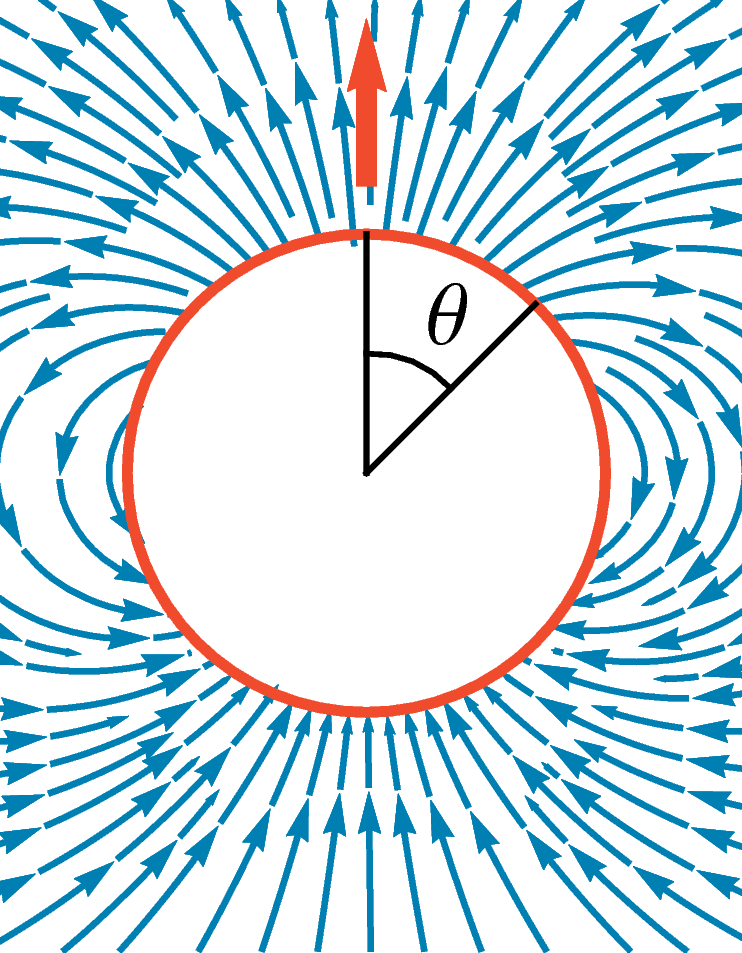
Neutral, $\beta=0$

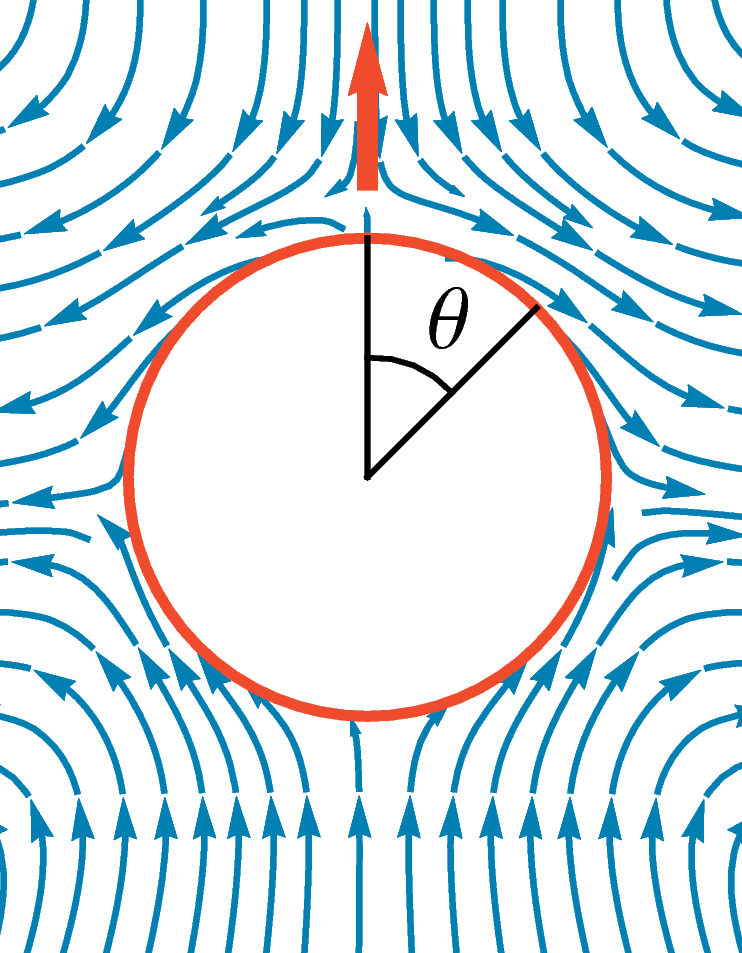
Puller, $\beta=5$

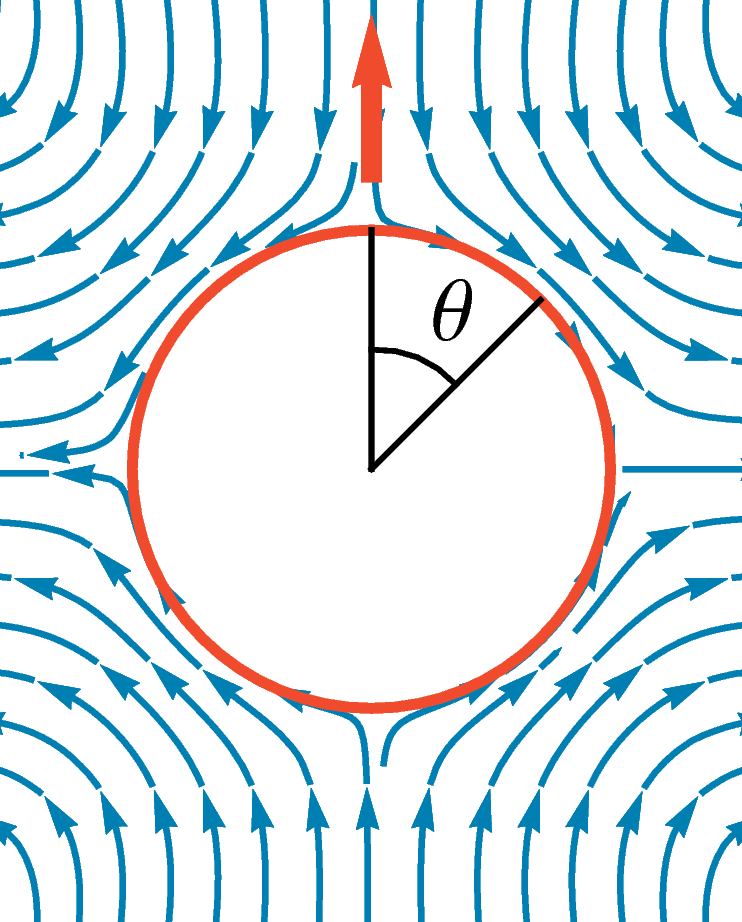
Shaker, $\beta=\infty$

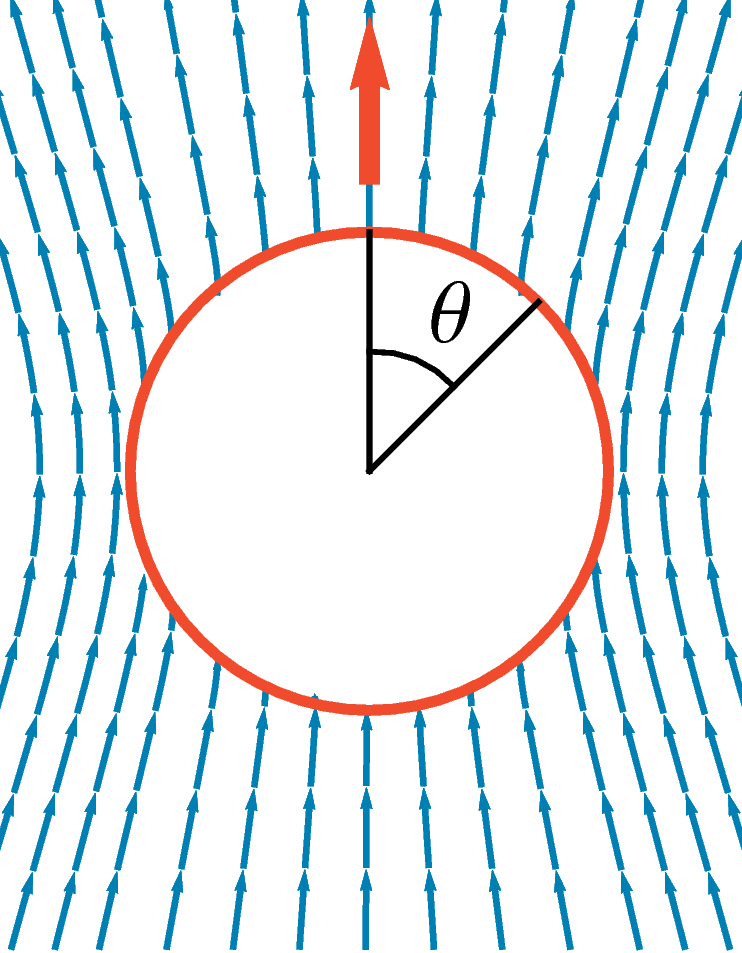
Passive particle

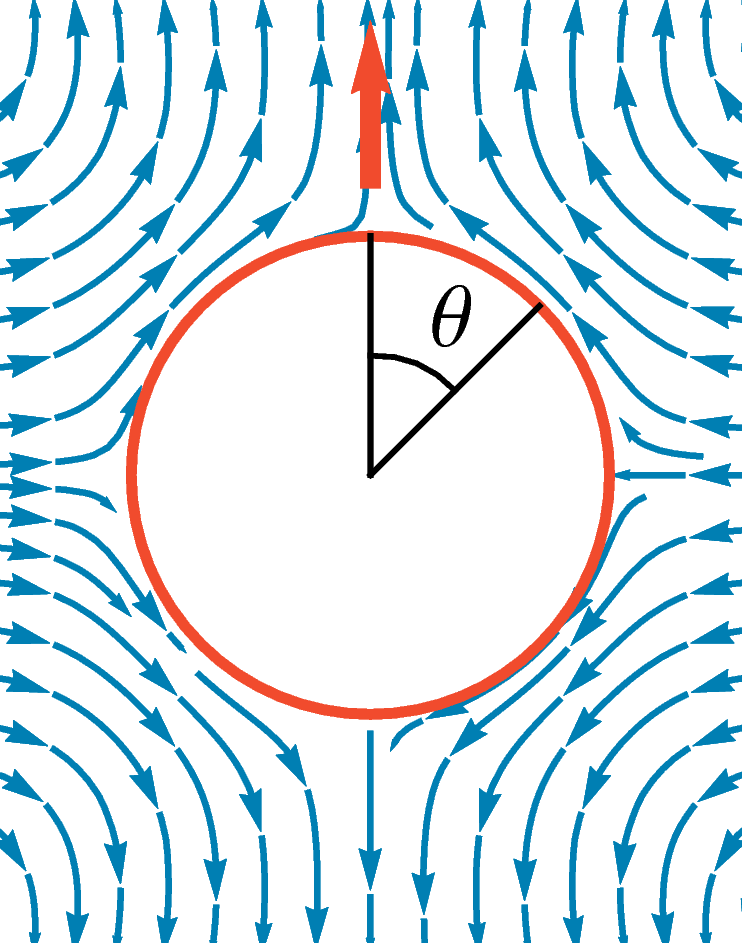
Shaker, $\beta=-\infty$

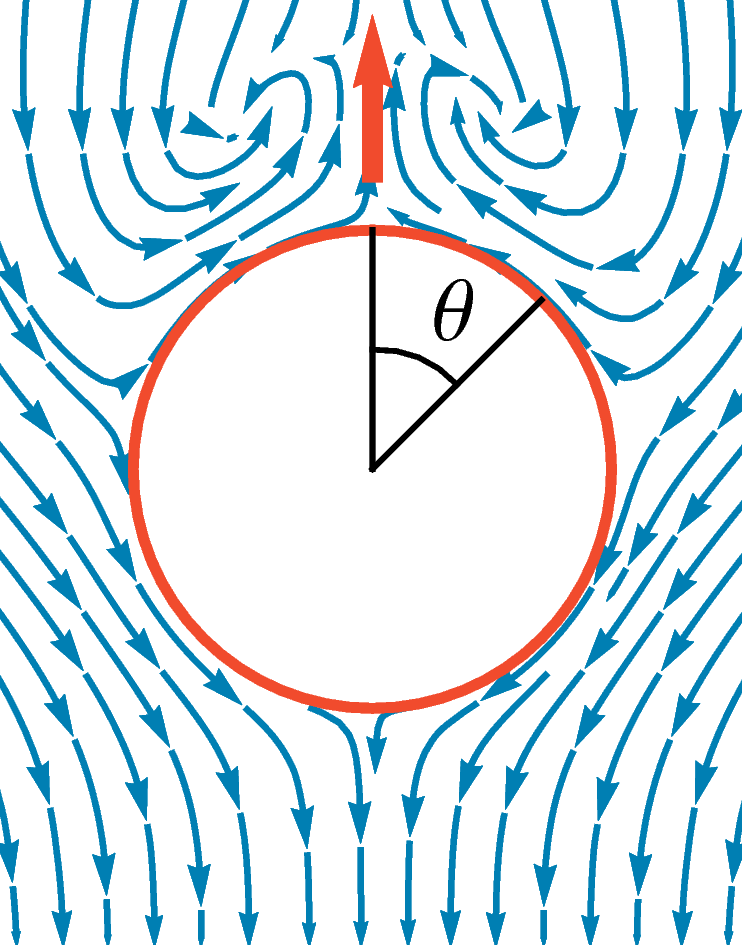
Pusher, $\beta=-5$

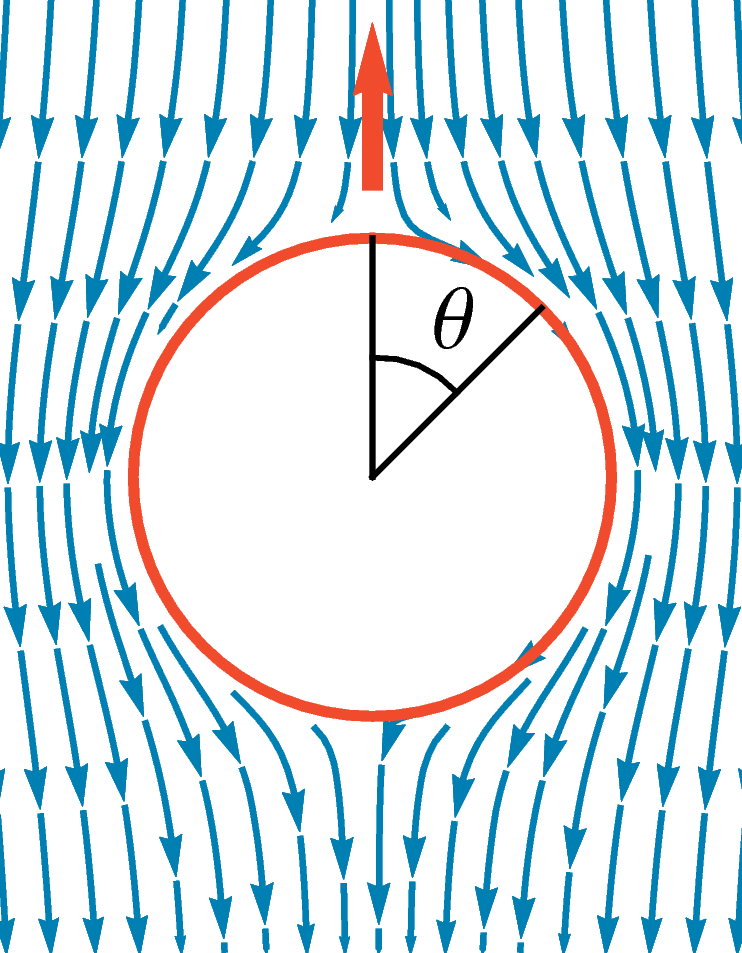
Neutral, $\beta=0$

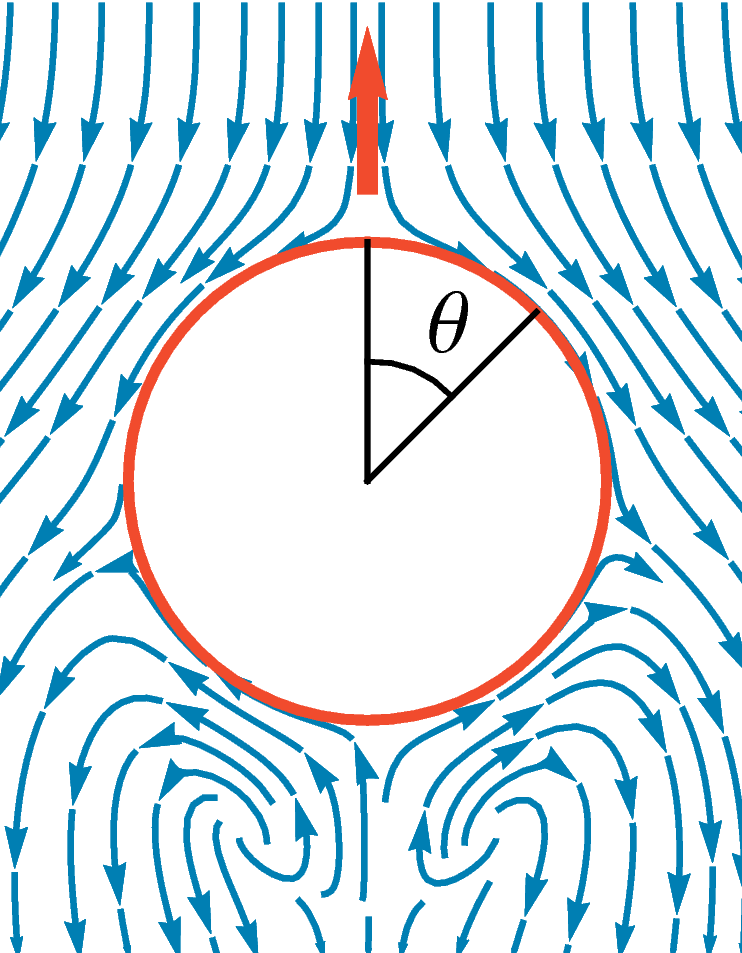
Puller, $\beta=5$

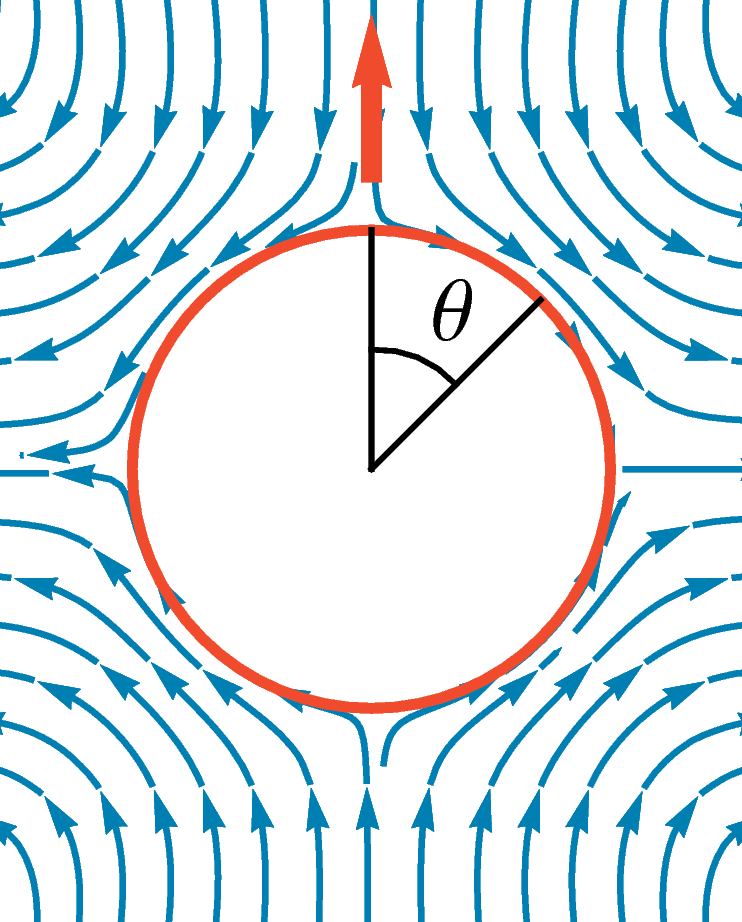
Shaker, $\beta=\infty$

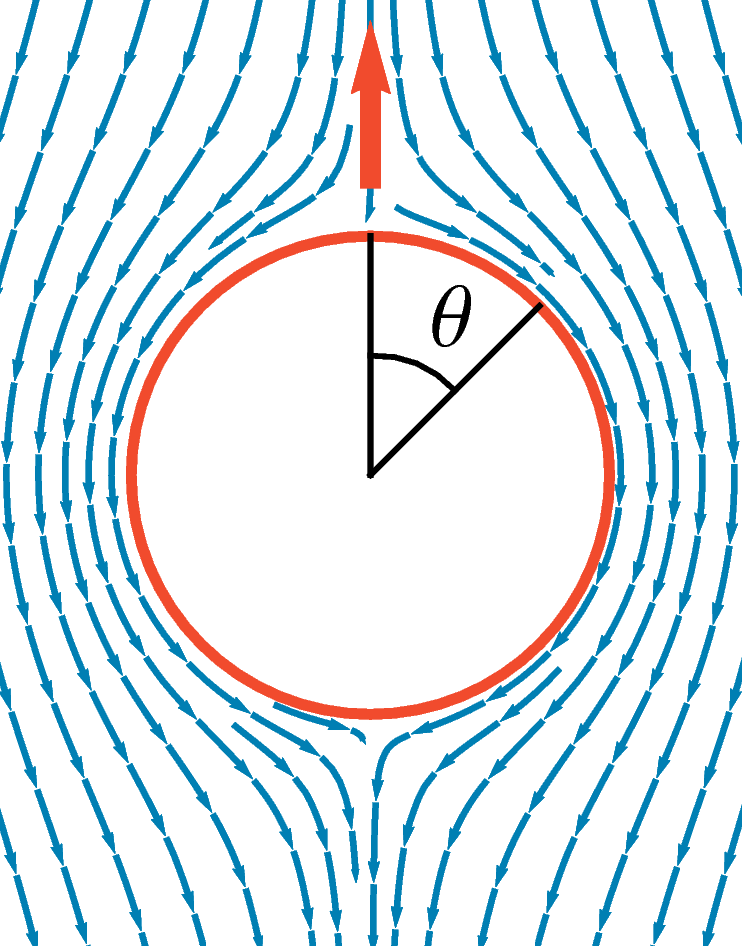
Passive particle

Velocity field of squirmer and passive particle (top row: lab frame, bottom row: swimmer frame, $\beta = B_2/|B_1|$ ).

== Swimming speed and lab frame ==
By using the Lorentz Reciprocal Theorem, one finds the velocity vector of the particle $\mathbf{U}=-\tfrac{1}{2} \int \mathbf{u}(R,\theta)\sin\theta\mathrm{d}\theta=\tfrac 2 3 B_1 \mathbf{e}_z$. The flow in a fixed lab frame is given by $\mathbf{u}^L=\mathbf{u}+\mathbf{U}$:

$u_r^L(r,\theta)=\frac{R^3}{r^3}UP_1(\cos\theta)+\sum_{n=2}^{\infty}\left(\frac{R^{n+2}}{r^{n+2}}-\frac{R^n}{r^n}\right)B_nP_n(\cos\theta)\;,$
$u_{\theta}^L(r,\theta)=\frac{R^3}{2r^3}UV_1(\cos\theta)+\sum_{n=2}^{\infty}\frac 1 2\left(n\frac{R^{n+2}}{r^{n+2}}+(2-n)\frac{R^n}{r^n}\right)B_nV_n(\cos\theta)\;.$

with swimming speed $U=|\mathbf{U}|$. Note, that $\lim_{r\rightarrow\infty}\mathbf{u}^L=0$ and $u^L_r(R,\theta)\neq 0$.

== Structure of the flow and squirmer parameter ==
The series above are often truncated at $n=2$ in the study of far field flow, $r\gg R$. Within that approximation, $u_{\theta}(R,\theta)=B_1\sin\theta+\tfrac 1 2 B_2 \sin 2 \theta$, with squirmer parameter $\beta=B_2/|B_1|$. The first mode $n=1$ characterizes a hydrodynamic source dipole with decay $\propto 1/r^3$ (and with that the swimming speed $U$). The second mode $n=2$ corresponds to a hydrodynamic stresslet or force dipole with decay $\propto 1/r^2$. Thus, $\beta$ gives the ratio of both contributions and the direction of the force dipole. $\beta$ is used to categorize microswimmers into pushers, pullers and neutral swimmers.

| Swimmer Type | pusher | neutral swimmer | puller | shaker | passive particle |
| Squirmer Parameter | $\beta<0$ | $\beta=0$ | $\beta>0$ | $\beta=\pm\infty$ | |
| Decay of Velocity Far Field | $\mathbf{u}\propto 1/r^2$ | $\mathbf{u}\propto 1/r^3$ | $\mathbf{u}\propto 1/r^2$ | $\mathbf{u}\propto 1/r^2$ | $\mathbf{u}\propto 1/r$ |
| Biological Example | E. coli | Paramecium | Chlamydomonas reinhardtii | | |

The above figures show the velocity field in the lab frame and in the particle-fixed frame. The hydrodynamic dipole and quadrupole fields of the squirmer model result from surface stresses, due to beating cilia on bacteria, or chemical reactions or thermal non-equilibrium on Janus particles. The squirmer is force-free. On the contrary, the velocity field of the passive particle results from an external force, its far-field corresponds to a "stokeslet" or hydrodynamic monopole. A force-free passive particle doesn't move and doesn't create any flow field.

== See also ==
- Protist locomotion
