= Active Brownian particle =

Model of self-propelled motion in a dissipative environment

An active Brownian particle (ABP) is a model of self-propelled motion in a dissipative environment. It is a nonequilibrium generalization of a Brownian particle.

The self-propulsion results from a force that acts on the particle's center of mass and points in the direction of an intrinsic body axis (the particle orientation). It is common to treat particles as spheres, though other shapes (such as rods) have also been studied. Both the center of mass and the direction of the propulsive force are subjected to white noise, which contributes a diffusive component to the overall dynamics. In its simplest version, the dynamics is overdamped and the propulsive force has constant magnitude, so that the magnitude of the velocity is likewise constant (speed-up to terminal velocity is instantaneous).

The term active Brownian particle usually refers to this simple model and its straightforward extensions, though some authors have used it for more general self-propelled particle models.

== Equations of motion ==
Mathematically, an active Brownian particle is described by its center of mass coordinates $\mathbf{r}$ and a unit vector $\hat{\mathbf{n}}$ giving the orientation. In two dimensions, the orientation vector can be parameterized by the 2D polar angle $\theta$, so that $\hat{\mathbf{n}} = (\cos \theta, \sin \theta)$. The equations of motion in this case are the following stochastic differential equations:

$$\begin{align}
\dot{\mathbf{r}} &= v_0 \hat{\mathbf{n}} - (m \xi)^{-1} \nabla V(\mathbf{r}) + \sqrt{2 D_t} \, \boldsymbol{\eta}_{\text{trans}}(t)
\\
\dot{\theta} &= \sqrt{2 D_r} \, \eta_{\text{rot}}(t).
\end{align}$$

where

$$\begin{align}
\langle \eta_{\text{rot}}(t)\rangle &= 0; \qquad \langle \eta_{\text{rot}}(t) \eta_{\text{rot}}(t')\rangle = \delta(t - t') \\
\langle \boldsymbol{\eta}_{\text{trans}}(t)\rangle &= \boldsymbol{0}; \qquad \langle \boldsymbol{\eta}_{\text{trans}}(t) \boldsymbol{\eta}^{\intercal}_{\text{trans}}(t') \rangle = \mathbf{I} \delta(t-t')
\end{align}$$

with $\mathbf{I}$ the 2×2 identity matrix. The terms $\boldsymbol{\eta}_{\text{trans}}(t)$ and $\eta_{\text{rot}}(t)$ are translational and rotational white noise, which is understood as a heuristic representation of the Wiener process. Finally, $V(\mathbf{r})$ is an external potential, $m$ is the mass, $\xi$ is the friction, $v_0$ is the magnitude of the self-propulsion velocity, and $D_t$ and $D_r$ are the translational and rotational diffusion coefficients.

The dynamics can also be described in terms of a probability density function $f(\mathbf{r},\theta, t)$, which gives the probability, at time $t$, of finding a particle at position $\mathbf{r}$ and with orientation $\theta$. By averaging over the stochastic trajectories from the equations of motion, $f(\mathbf{r},\theta, t)$ can be shown to obey the following partial differential equation:

$$\frac{\partial f}{\partial t} + v_0 \hat{n} \cdot \nabla f = (m \xi)^{-1} \nabla \cdot (\nabla V(\mathbf{r}) \, f) + D_r \frac{\partial^2 f}{\partial \theta^2} + D_t \nabla^2 f$$

== Behavior ==
For an isolated particle far from boundaries, the combination of diffusion and self-propulsion produces a stochastic (fluctuating) trajectory that appears ballistic over short length scales and diffusive over large length scales. The transition from ballistic to diffusive motion is defined by a characteristic length $\ell = v_0/D_r$, called the persistence length.

Trajectories of active Brownian particles can be formally mapped to inextensible semiflexible polymers, exhibiting a crossover in end-to-end distance distributions between Gaussian and semiflexible-like behavior.

In the presence of boundaries or other particles, more complex behavior is possible. Even in the absence of attractive forces, particles tend to accumulate at boundaries. Obstacles placed within a bath of active Brownian particles can induce long-range density variations and nonzero currents in steady state.

Sufficiently concentrated suspensions of active Brownian particles phase separate into a dense and dilute regions. The particles' motility drives a positive feedback loop, in which particles collide and hinder each other's motion, leading to further collisions and particle accumulation. At a coarse-grained level, a particle's effective self-propulsion velocity decreases with increased density, which promotes clustering. In the more general context of self-propelled particle models, this behavior is known as motility-induced phase separation. It is a type of athermal phase separation because it occurs even if the particles are spheres with hard-core (purely repulsive) interactions.

== Variations ==
A variant of active Brownian motion involves complete directional reversals in addition to rotational diffusion. This movement pattern is seen in bacteria like Myxococcus xanthus, Pseudomonas putida, Pseudoalteromonas haloplanktis, Shewanella putrefaciens, and Pseudomonas citronellolis.

== See also ==
- Run-and-tumble motion – Type of bacterial motion
- Janus particle – Type of nanoparticle or microparticle
- Langevin equation – Stochastic differential equation
- Active matter – Matter behavior at system scale
- Nonequilibrium statistical mechanics – Physics of many interacting particles

== Sources ==
- Baek, Yongjoo; Solon, Alexandre P.; Xu, Xinpeng; Nikola, Nikolai; Kafri, Yariv (2018-01-31). "Generic Long-Range Interactions Between Passive Bodies in an Active Fluid". Physical Review Letters. 120 (5) 058002. American Physical Society (APS). arXiv:1709.02281. doi:10.1103/physrevlett.120.058002. hdl:1721.1/114400. ISSN 0031-9007. PMID 29481190. S2CID 3744892.
- Bechinger, Clemens; Di Leonardo, Roberto; Löwen, Hartmut; Reichhardt, Charles; Volpe, Giorgio; Volpe, Giovanni (2016-11-23). "Active Particles in Complex and Crowded Environments". Reviews of Modern Physics. 88 (4). American Physical Society (APS). arXiv:1602.00081. doi:10.1103/revmodphys.88.045006. hdl:11693/36533. ISSN 0034-6861. S2CID 14940249.
- Cates, Michael E.; Tailleur, Julien (2015-03-01). "Motility-Induced Phase Separation". Annual Review of Condensed Matter Physics. 6 (1). Annual Reviews: 219–244. arXiv:1406.3533. doi:10.1146/annurev-conmatphys-031214-014710. ISSN 1947-5454. S2CID 15672131.
- Fodor, Étienne; Cristina Marchetti, M. (2018). "The statistical physics of active matter: From self-catalytic colloids to living cells". Physica A: Statistical Mechanics and Its Applications. 504. Elsevier BV: 106–120. arXiv:1708.08652. doi:10.1016/j.physa.2017.12.137. ISSN 0378-4371. S2CID 119450187.
- Howse, Jonathan R.; Jones, Richard A. L.; Ryan, Anthony J.; Gough, Tim; Vafabakhsh, Reza; Golestanian, Ramin (2007-07-27). "Self-Motile Colloidal Particles: From Directed Propulsion to Random Walk". Physical Review Letters. 99 (4) 048102. arXiv:0706.4406. doi:10.1103/PhysRevLett.99.048102.
- Marchetti, M. Cristina; Fily, Yaouen; Henkes, Silke; Patch, Adam; Yllanes, David (2016). "Minimal model of active colloids highlights the role of mechanical interactions in controlling the emergent behavior of active matter". Current Opinion in Colloid & Interface Science. 21. Elsevier BV: 34–43. arXiv:1510.00425. doi:10.1016/j.cocis.2016.01.003. ISSN 1359-0294. S2CID 97138568.
- Ni, Ran; Cohen Stuart, Martien A.; Bolhuis, Peter G. (2015-01-07). "Tunable Long Range Forces Mediated by Self-Propelled Colloidal Hard Spheres". Physical Review Letters. 114 (1) 018302. American Physical Society (APS). arXiv:1403.1533. doi:10.1103/physrevlett.114.018302. ISSN 0031-9007. PMID 25615510. S2CID 8776685.
- Peruani, Fernando (2016). "Active Brownian rods". The European Physical Journal Special Topics. 225 (11–12). Springer Science and Business Media LLC: 2301–2317. arXiv:1512.07567. doi:10.1140/epjst/e2016-60062-0. ISSN 1951-6355. S2CID 255387461.
- Romanczuk, P.; Bär, M.; Ebeling, W.; Lindner, B.; Schimansky-Geier, L. (2012). "Active Brownian particles". The European Physical Journal Special Topics. 202 (1). Springer Science and Business Media LLC: 1–162. arXiv:1202.2442. doi:10.1140/epjst/e2012-01529-y. ISSN 1951-6355. S2CID 255389128.
- Santra, Ion; Basu, Urna; Sabhapandit, Sanjib (13 July 2021). "Active Brownian motion with directional reversals". Physical Review E. 104 (1) L012601. arXiv:2101.11327. doi:10.1103/PhysRevE.104.L012601. eISSN 2470-0053. ISSN 2470-0045. PMID 34412243. S2CID 231718971.
- Shaebani, M. Reza; Wysocki, Adam; Winkler, Roland G.; Gompper, Gerhard; Rieger, Heiko (2020-03-10). "Computational models for active matter". Nature Reviews Physics. 2 (4). Springer Science and Business Media LLC: 181–199. arXiv:1910.02528. doi:10.1038/s42254-020-0152-1. ISSN 2522-5820. S2CID 203836019.
- Zöttl, Andreas; Stark, Holger (2016-05-11). "Emergent behavior in active colloids". Journal of Physics: Condensed Matter. 28 (25) 253001. IOP Publishing. arXiv:1601.06643. doi:10.1088/0953-8984/28/25/253001. ISSN 0953-8984. S2CID 3948148.
- Shee, Amir; Dhar, Abhishek; Chaudhuri, Debasish (2020-04-23). "Active Brownian particles: mapping to equilibrium polymers and exact computation of moments". Soft Matter. 16. RSC Publishing: 4776-4787. arXiv:2002.01815v3. doi:10.1039/D0SM00367K. ISSN 1744-6848. S2CID 211032202.
