= Dufour effect =

The Dufour effect is the energy flux due to a mass concentration gradient occurring as a coupled effect of irreversible processes. The effect is named after Louis Dufour, who studied it in 1872. It is the reciprocal phenomenon to the Soret effect. The concentration gradient results in a temperature change. For binary liquid mixtures, the Dufour effect is usually considered negligible, whereas in binary gas mixtures the effect can be significant.
