= Soret peak =

Band of absorption in spectroscopy UV-Vis around 400 nm

In spectroscopy, a Soret peak or Soret band is an intense peak in the blue wavelength region of the visible spectrum. The peak is named after its discoverer, Jacques-Louis Soret. The term is commonly used in absorption spectroscopy, corresponding to a wavelength of maximum absorption (electromagnetic radiation) ranging around 400 nm in the blue region.

== Examples ==
The Soret band arises primarily due to an electron dipole movement that allows π-π* transitions; most common in porphyrin compounds. Most analytical studies of porphyrin‑containing moiety can be done using ultraviolet–visible spectroscopy and exciting wavelength at the respective Soret band wavelength. For example, the "Soret peak" is used to describe the absorption of vividly-pigmented heme-containing moieties, such as various cytochromes. For example, the cytochromes P450, a diverse class of monooxygenase enzymes, exhibit a Soret peak at 450 nm in their reduced form when saturated with carbon monoxide. This is called a CO difference spectrum assay: the absorbance spectrum of the solution is subtracted from the spectrum after saturation with carbon monoxide. If the P450 has been denatured, for example due to bad handling, the peak shifts to 420 nm. It is possible to see both 420 nm and 450 nm peaks on the same spectrum if only a portion of the P450 has been denatured.
