= Charles Soret =

Swiss physicist and chemist (1854–1904)

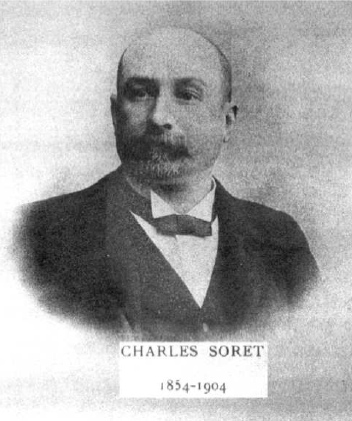
Charles Soret

Charles Soret (born 23 September 1854, Geneva, Switzerland; died 4 April 1904) was a Swiss physicist and chemist. He is known for his work on thermodiffusion (the so-called Soret effect).

== Life ==
Charles Soret was the son of Jacques-Louis Soret, professor of physical medicine at University of Geneva, and Clémentine Odier. In 1872, Charles graduated from an art college in Geneva and, two years later, he added a degree in mathematics. In addition, he also attended lectures in physics and other sciences. He continued studies in mathematics at the Sorbonne, where he received his MA in 1876. He believed that a good physicist is first of all a good mathematician; therefore, only afterwards he focused on physics in which he obtained a master's degree two years later.

Soon, he was offered a place in the Department of crystallography and mineralogy at the University of Geneva. There, in 1879, he became a lecturer and a full professor in 1881.

In 1879, he published his first discussion on thermodiffusion on the basis of experiments with solutions of NaCl and KNO_{3} in pipes with heated or cooled ends. He noticed higher concentrations at the cooler end of the pipe. His experiments confirmed the results of C. Ludwig (published 20 years earlier) of which Soret probably did not know.

In addition to thermal migration, he also conducted research on refractometry.

In 1898, he became the rector of the University of Geneva. He died in April 1904 due to gastrointestinal illness, a few days after a successful operation.
