= Jacques-Louis Soret =

Swiss chemist (1827–1890)

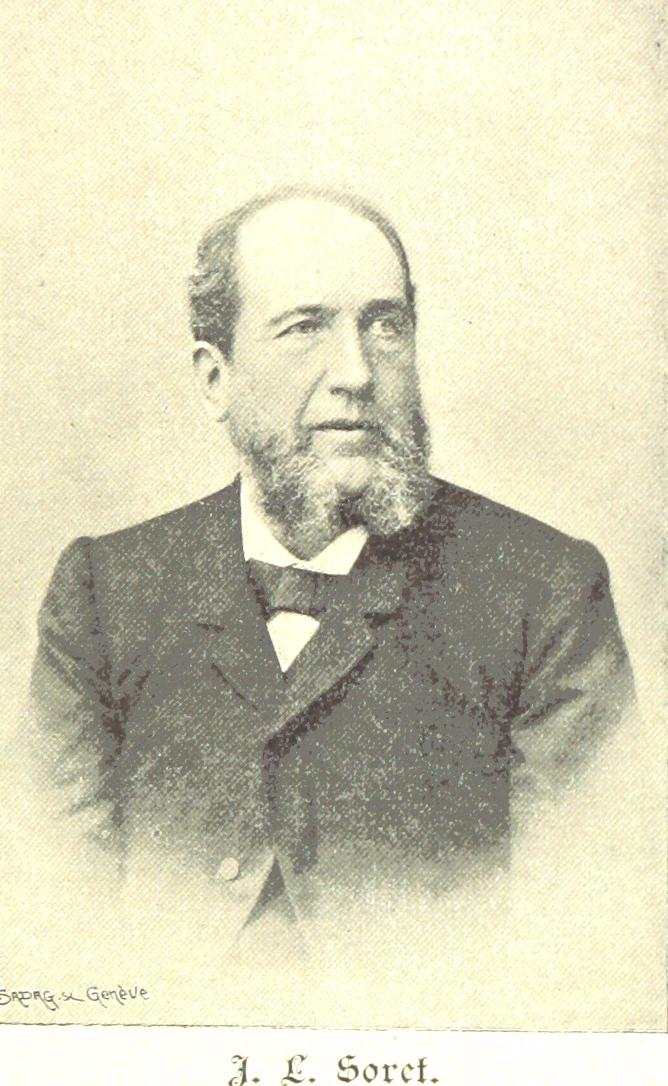
- Jacques-Louis Soret
- Born: 30 June 1827; Geneva, Switzerland
- Died: 13 May 1890 (aged 62); Geneva, Switzerland
- Known for: discovery of holmium, structure of ozone

Jacques-Louis Soret (French pronunciation: [ʒak lwi sɔʁɛ]; 30 June 1827 – 13 May 1890) was a Swiss chemist and spectroscopist. He studied both spectroscopy and electrolysis.

== Career ==
Soret held the chairs of chemistry (1873-1887) and medical physics (1887-1890) at the University of Geneva.

Soret determined the chemical composition and density of ozone and the conditions for its production. He described it correctly as being composed of three oxygen atoms bound together.

Soret also developed optical instruments. He climbed Mont Blanc, where he was the first scientist to make actinometric measurements of solar radiation. These observations were published in the Philosophical Magazine in 1867.

In 1878, he and Marc Delafontaine were the first to spectroscopically observe the element later named holmium, which they identified simply as an "earth X" derived from "erbia". Independently, Per Teodor Cleve separated it chemically from thulium and erbium in 1879. All three researchers are given credit for the element's discovery.

The Soret peak or Soret band, a strong absorption band at approximately 420 nm in the absorption spectra of hemoglobin and other porphyrins, is also named after him.

== Death ==
Jacques-Louis Soret died in Geneva on 13 May 1890. His son was Charles Soret, a recognized physicist and chemist in his own right.
