= Pseudomonas citronellolis =

Scientific classification
- Domain: Bacteria
- Kingdom: Pseudomonadati
- Phylum: Pseudomonadota
- Class: Gammaproteobacteria
- Order: Pseudomonadales
- Family: Pseudomonadaceae
- Genus: Pseudomonas
- Species: P. citronellolis

Binomial name
- Pseudomonas citronellolis Seubert 1960

Type strain
- ATCC 13674 CCUG 17933; CFBP 5585; CIP 104381; DSM 50332; IAM 15129; LMG 18378; NRRL B-2504

Species of bacterium

Pseudomonas citronellolis is a Gram-negative, bacillus bacterium that is used to study the mechanisms of pyruvate carboxylase. It was first isolated from forest soil, under pine trees, in northern Virginia, United States.

== Characteristics ==
Pseudomonas citronellolis a Gram-negative, bacillus bacterium. It was first isolated from forest soil, under pine trees, in northern Virginia, United States. It has one polar flagellum allowing it to be motile.

=== Relationship with plants ===
On agar, P. citronellolis forms round white colonies that produce fluorescent green pigments. It also produces a biofilm and is resistant to most antibiotics. The bacteria has a biotic relationship with its plant host (either with pine trees or basil). It produces a type of hormone that induces plant cell elongation and division, leading to an increase of local available nutrients.

=== Metabolic potential ===
The study of P. citronellolis is important because it could be used as a model to research metabolism and enzyme activity concerning glucose. It also has the potential for use in biodegradation of polyethylene.

== Genome ==
The size of the genome is 6,951,444 bp with the size of DNA coding 6,028,113 bp. The average GC content is 67.11% and 4,665,300 bp . Of the 6169 predicted genes, 6071 (98.41%) were protein CDS of which 4762 genes had a function prediction. A total of 96 RNA genes were predicted including 15 rRNA.

The Pseudomonas citronellolis's DNA isolation for a template's 16sR sequencing revealed 25 μl of diluted genomic DNA. BOXAIR, repetitive extragenic palindromic sequence-based PCR analysis (REP-PCR), and enterobacterial repetitive intergenic consensus (ERIC) were used as primers to amplify the DNA. PCR for the 29 strains of P. citronellolis yielded 8 to 12 amplified bands. These were very distinguishable with sizes ranging from 9,000 bp to 100 bp. REP-PCR produces the most complex amplified banding patterns, which reflected diversity among the P citronellolis strains isolated from different oily sludge-contaminated soil samples. The ribotype patterns of the P. citronellolis strains showed multiple amplicons that strongly indicated polymorphism of the rRNA spacer region. This experiment on the genome did not contain any plasmids and provided no evidence for its existence.

Based on 16S rRNA analysis, P. citronellolis has been placed in the P. aeruginosa group. P. citronellolis has also been found capable of the biosynthesis of polyhydroxyal-kanoates from "linear mono- and dicarboxylic acids", a type of bacterial-synthesized polyester.

The P. citronellolis P3B5 genome contains genes that encode for six predicted lactamases that resist against lactam antibiotics. Furthermore, the genome contains genes encoding for efflux pumps that provide resistances to other antibiotics, such as trimethoprim. The P3B5 genome encodes genes that should enable it to degrade alkanes. In combination with its stress-resilience and plant reliance lifestyle, makes this organism an intriguing candidate for plant remediation approaches. Resistance to several ABs was observed and several ABR genes were detected, but no evidence for the potential of ABR gene mobilization could be found.
