= Persistent random walk =

Modification of the random walk model

The persistent random walk is a modification of the random walk model.

A population of particles are distributed on a line, with constant speed $c_0$, and each particle's velocity may be reversed at any moment. The reversal time is exponentially distributed as $e^{-t/\tau}/\tau$, then the population density $n$ evolves according to
$$(2\tau^{-1} \partial_t  + \partial_{tt} - c_0^2 \partial_{xx}) n = 0$$
which is the telegrapher's equation.
