= Nicolas Soret =

Nicolas Soret (end of the 16th century in Reims – begin of the 17th century) was a French catholic priest, poet and playwright. In 1606, he published La Ceciliade, ou le Martyre sanglant de sainte Cecile, patronne des musiciens, choirs set in music by Abraham Blondet, Paris, Rezé, 1606.

On 9 May 1624, he had L'Élection divine de Saint Nicolas à l'archevêché de Myre avec un sommaire de sa vie presented at Reims.

== Bibliography ==
- Abbé Jean-Baptiste-Joseph Boulliot, Biographie ardennaise ou Histoire des Ardennais qui se sont fait remarquer par leurs écrits, leurs actions, leurs vertus ou leurs erreurs, Paris, 1830, vol.2, p. 388-389 .
- Collectif, Biographie universelle, ancienne et moderne, Paris, au bureau de la Biographie universelle, 1849, vol.82, p. 377
