= Thermophoresis =

Molecular diffusion under the effect of a thermal gradient

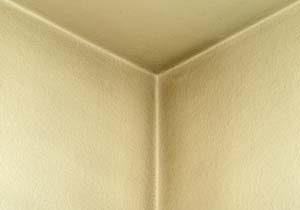
Dust deposition by thermophoresis.

Thermophoresis (also thermomigration, thermodiffusion, the Soret effect, or the Ludwig–Soret effect) is a phenomenon observed in mixtures of mobile particles where the different particle types exhibit different responses to the force of a temperature gradient. This phenomenon tends to move light molecules to hot regions and heavy molecules to cold regions. The term thermophoresis most often applies to aerosol mixtures whose mean free path $\lambda$ is comparable to its characteristic length scale $L$, but may also commonly refer to the phenomenon in all phases of matter. The term Soret effect normally applies to liquid mixtures, which behave according to different, less well-understood mechanisms than gaseous mixtures. Thermophoresis may not apply to thermomigration in solids, especially multi-phase alloys.

== Thermophoretic force ==
The phenomenon is observed at the scale of one millimeter or less. An example that may be observed by the naked eye with good lighting is when the hot rod of an electric heater is surrounded by tobacco smoke: the smoke goes away from the immediate vicinity of the hot rod. As the small particles of air nearest the hot rod are heated, they create a fast flow away from the rod, down the temperature gradient. While the kinetic energy of the particles is similar at the same temperature, lighter particles acquire higher velocity compared to the heavy ones. When they collide with the large, slower-moving particles of the tobacco smoke, they push the latter away from the rod. The force that has pushed the smoke particles away from the rod is an example of a thermophoretic force, as the mean free path of air at ambient conditions is 68 nm and the characteristic length scales are between 100–1000 nm.

Thermodiffusion is labeled "positive" when particles move from a hot to cold region and "negative" when the reverse is true. Typically the heavier/larger species in a mixture exhibit positive thermophoretic behavior, while the lighter/smaller species exhibit negative behavior. In addition to the sizes of the various types of particles and the steepness of the temperature gradient, the heat conductivity and heat absorption of the particles play a role. Braun and coworkers have suggested that the charge and entropy of the hydration shell of molecules play a major role for the thermophoresis of biomolecules in aqueous solutions.

The quantitative description is given by
$$\frac{\partial \chi}{\partial t} = \nabla \cdot (D\,\nabla \chi + D_\text{T}\, \chi(1 - \chi) \,\nabla T),$$
where $\chi$ is the particle concentration, $D$ the diffusion coefficient, and $D_\text{T}$ the thermodiffusion coefficient. The quotient of both coefficients,
$$S_T = \frac{D_\text{T}}{D},$$
is called Soret coefficient.

The thermophoresis factor has been calculated from molecular interaction potentials derived from known molecular models.

== Thermophoretic speeds for aerosol particles in gases ==
In 1879 James Clerk Maxwell obtained a simple expression for the velocity $\vec{v}$ of a particle suspended in a gas where there is a temperature gradient. This is

$\vec{v}=-\frac{3}{4}\nu \nabla \ln T$

with ν the kinematic viscosity of the gas. This assumes that the particle is larger than the mean-free path of the gas, or in other words assumes small Knudsen number. Note that the minus sign means that in dilute gases thermophoresis always moves particles down temperature gradients, i.e., towards colder regions. The kinematic viscosity of air under standard conditions is of order 10^{-5} m^{2}/s, and so a 10 K temperature change over a distance of 1 cm induces motion with a speed of order 0.1 mm/s.

== Applications ==
The thermophoretic force has a number of practical applications. The basis for applications is that, because different particle types move differently under the force of the temperature gradient, the particle types can be separated by that force after they have been mixed together, or prevented from mixing if they are already separated.

Impurity ions may move from the cold side of a semiconductor wafer towards the hot side, since the higher temperature makes the transition structure required for atomic jumps more achievable. The diffusive flux may occur in either direction (either up or down the temperature gradient), dependent on the materials involved. Thermophoretic force has been used in commercial precipitators for applications similar to electrostatic precipitators. It is exploited in the manufacturing of optical fiber in vacuum deposition processes. It can be important as a transport mechanism in fouling. Thermophoresis has also been shown to have potential in facilitating drug discovery by allowing the detection of aptamer binding by comparison of the bound versus unbound motion of the target molecule. This approach has been termed microscale thermophoresis. Furthermore, thermophoresis has been demonstrated as a versatile technique for manipulating single biological macromolecules, such as genomic-length DNA, and HIV virus in micro- and nanochannels by means of light-induced local heating. Thermophoresis is one of the methods used to separate different polymer particles in field flow fractionation.

== History ==
Thermophoresis in gas mixtures was first observed and reported by John Tyndall in 1870 and further understood by John Strutt (Baron Rayleigh) in 1882. Thermophoresis in liquid mixtures was first observed and reported by Carl Ludwig in 1856 and further understood by Charles Soret in 1879.

James Clerk Maxwell wrote in 1873 concerning mixtures of different types of molecules (and this could include small particulates larger than molecules):

This process of diffusion ... goes on in gases and liquids and even in some solids ... The dynamical theory also tells us what will happen if molecules of different masses are allowed to knock about together. The greater masses will go slower than the smaller ones, so that, on an average, every molecule, great or small, will have the same energy of motion. The proof of this dynamical theorem, in which I claim the priority, has recently been greatly developed and improved by Dr. Ludwig Boltzmann.

It has been analyzed theoretically by Sydney Chapman.

Thermophoresis at solids interfaces was numerically discovered by Schoen et al. in 2006 and was experimentally confirmed by Barreiro et al.

Negative thermophoresis in fluids was first noticed in 1967 by Dwyer in a theoretical solution, and the name was coined by Sone. Negative thermophoresis at solids interfaces was first observed by Leng et al. in 2016.

== See also ==
- Deposition (aerosol physics)
- Dufour effect
- Maxwell–Stefan diffusion
- Microscale thermophoresis
