= Janus particles =

Type of nanoparticle or microparticle

A schematic view of a basic spherical Janus particle with two distinct faces: Sides A and B represent two surfaces with different physical or chemical properties.

Janus particles are special types of nanoparticles or microparticles whose surfaces have two or more distinct physical properties. This unique surface of Janus particles allows two different types of chemistry to occur on the same particle. The simplest case of a Janus particle is achieved by dividing the particle into two distinct parts, each of them either made of a different material, or bearing different functional groups. For example, a Janus particle may have one half of its surface composed of hydrophilic groups and the other half hydrophobic groups, the particles might have two surfaces of different color, fluorescence, or magnetic properties. This gives these particles unique properties related to their asymmetric structure and/or functionalization. Janus particles are so-named in reference to the two-faced Roman god Janus, as they may be said to—similarly—have "two faces".

== History ==
The term "Janus Particle" was coined by author Leonard Wibberley in his 1962 novel The Mouse on the Moon as a science-fictional device for space travel.

The term was first used in a real-world scientific context by C. Casagrande et al. in 1988 to describe spherical glass particles with one of the hemispheres hydrophilic and the other hydrophobic. In that work, the amphiphilic beads were synthesized by protecting one hemisphere with varnish and chemically treating the other hemisphere with a silane reagent. This method resulted in a particle with equal hydrophilic and hydrophobic areas. In 1991, Pierre-Gilles de Gennes mentioned the term "Janus grains" in his Nobel lecture; de Gennes advocated for the utility and scientific interest of Janus particles by pointing out that these "Janus grains" have the unique property of densely self-assembling at liquid–liquid interfaces, while allowing material transport to occur through the gaps between the solid amphiphilic particles.

In 1976 Nick Sheridon of Xerox Corporation patented a Twisting Ball Panel Display, where he refers to a "plurality of particles which have an electrical anisotropy." Although the term "Janus particles" was not yet used, Lee and coworkers also reported particles matching this description in 1985. They introduced asymmetric polystyrene/polymethylmethacrylate lattices from seeded emulsion polymerization. One year later, Casagrande and Veyssie reported the synthesis of glass beads that were made hydrophobic on only one hemisphere using octadecyl trichlorosilane, while the other hemisphere was protected with a cellulose varnish. The glass beads were studied for their potential to stabilize emulsification processes. Then several years later, Binks and Fletcher investigated the wettability of Janus beads at the interface between oil and water. They concluded Janus particles are both surface-active and amphiphilic, whereas homogeneous particles are only surface-active. Twenty years later, a plethora of Janus particles of different sizes, shapes and properties, with applications in textile, sensors, stabilization of emulsions, and magnetic field imaging have been reported. Variety of janus particles in sizes 10 μm to 53 μm in diameter are currently commercially available from Cospheric, who holds a patent on Hemispherical Coating Method for Microelements.

== Synthesis ==
The synthesis of Janus nanoparticles requires the ability to selectively create each side of a nanometer-sized particle with different chemical properties in a cost-effective and reliable way that produces the particle of interest in high yield. Initially, this was a difficult task, but within the last 10 years, methods have been refined to make it easier. Currently, three major methods are used in the synthesis of Janus nanoparticles.

=== Masking ===
Schematic view of the synthesis of Janus nanoparticles via masking. 1) Homogeneous nanoparticles are placed in or on a surface in such a way that only one hemisphere is exposed. 2) The exposed surface is exposed to a chemical 3) which change its properties. 4) The masking agent is then removed, releasing the Janus nanoparticles.

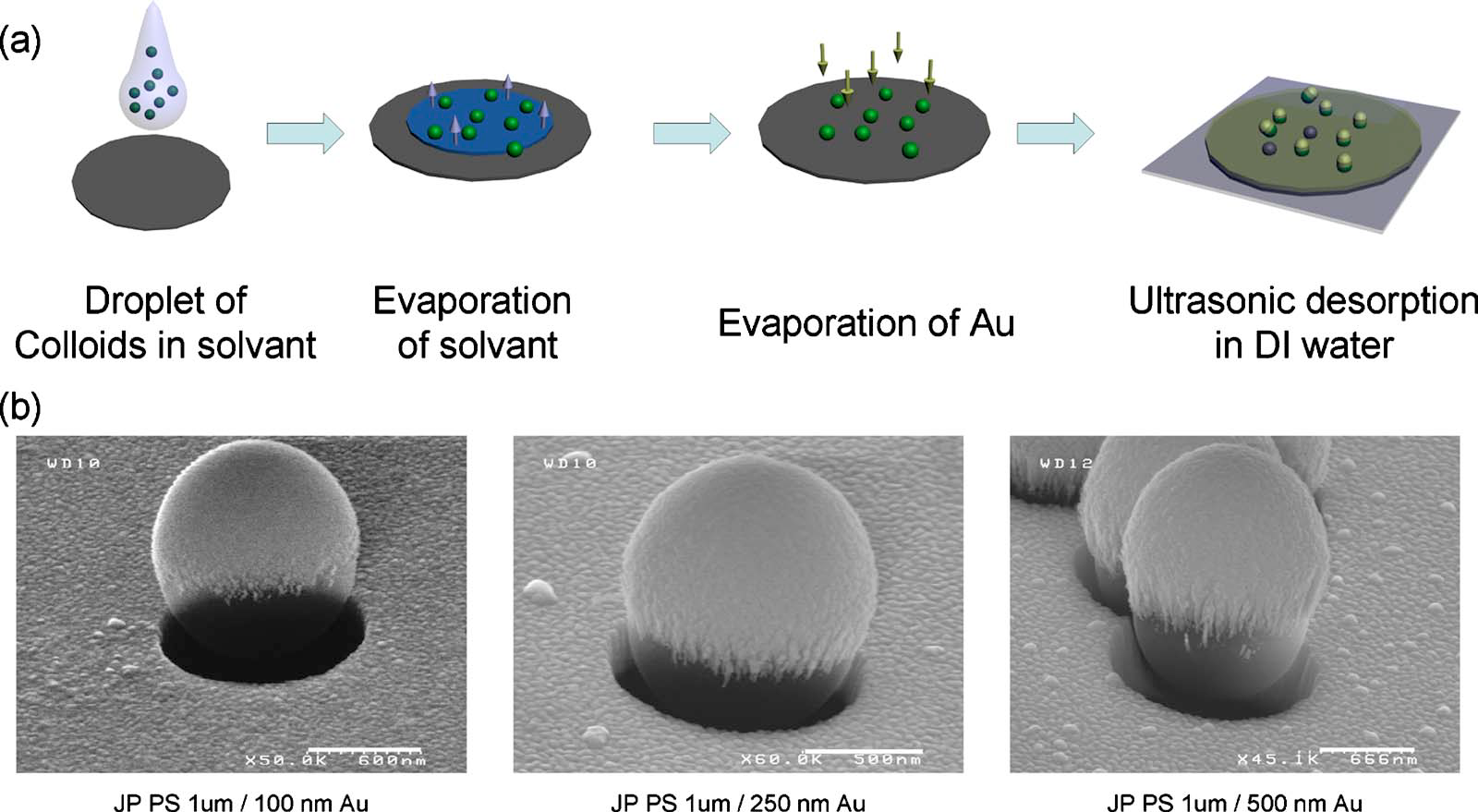
(a) Schematic representation of a masking microfabrication process. After creating a monolayer of fluorescent particles, bilayers of 1:10 Ti/Au are deposited on the top half of particles. The wafer is then placed in a beaker with 2 ml DI water and sonicated for 2 h to resuspend them. (b) SEM micrographs show the three types of JPs fabricated. Scale bar represents 500 nm.

Masking was one of the first techniques developed for the synthesis of Janus nanoparticles. This technique was developed by simply taking synthesis techniques of larger Janus particles and scaling down to the nanoscale. Masking, as the name suggests, involves the protection of one side of a nanoparticle followed by the modification of the unprotected side and the removal of the protection. Two masking techniques are common to produce Janus particles, evaporative deposition and a technique where the nanoparticle is suspended at the interface of two phases. However, only the phase separation technique scales well to the nanoscale.

The phase interface method involves trapping homogeneous nanoparticles at the interface of two immiscible phases. These methods typically involve the liquid–liquid and liquid–solid interfaces, but a gas–liquid interface method has been described.

The liquid–liquid interface method is best exemplified by Gu et al., who made an emulsion from water and an oil and added nanoparticles of magnetite. The magnetite nanoparticles aggregated at the interface of the water-oil mixture, forming a Pickering emulsion. Then, silver nitrate was added to the mixture, resulting in the deposition of silver nanoparticles on the surface of the magnetite nanoparticles. These Janus nanoparticles were then functionalized by the addition of various ligands with specific affinity for either the iron or silver. This method can also use gold or iron-platinum instead of magnetite.

A similar method is the gas–liquid interface method developed by Pradhan et al. In this method, hydrophobic alkane thiolate gold nanoparticles were placed in water, causing the formation of a monolayer of the hydrophobic gold nanoparticles on the surface. Air pressure was then increased, forcing the hydrophobic layer to be pushed into the water, decreasing the contact angle. When the contact angle was at the desired level, a hydrophilic thiol, 3-mercaptopropane-1,2-diol, was added to the water, causing the hydrophilic thiol to competitively replace the hydrophobic thiols, resulting in the formation of amphiphilic Janus nanoparticles.

The liquid–liquid and gas–liquid interface methods do have an issue where the nanoparticles can rotate in solution, causing the deposition of silver on more than one face. A liquid–liquid/liquid–solid hybrid interface method was first introduced by Granick et al. as a solution to this liquid–liquid method problem. In this method, molten paraffin wax was substituted for the oil, and silica nanoparticles for the magnetite. When the solution was cooled, the wax solidified, trapping half of each silica nanoparticle in the wax surface, leaving the other half of the silica exposed. The water was then filtered off and the wax-trapped silica nanoparticles were then exposed to a methanol solution containing (amino- propyl)triethoxysilane, which reacted with the exposed silica surfaces of the nanoparticles. The methanol solution was then filtered off and the wax was dissolved with chloroform, freeing the newly made Janus particles. Liu et al. reported the synthesis of acorn- and mushroom-shaped silica–aminopropyl–trimethoxysilane Janus nanoparticles using the hybrid liquid–liquid/liquid–solid method developed by Granick et al. They exposed homogenous aminopropyl-trimethoxysilane functionalized silica nanoparticles embedded in wax to an ammonium fluoride solution, which etched away the exposed surface. The liquid–liquid/liquid–solid hybrid method also has some drawbacks; when exposed to the second solvent for functionalization, some of the nanoparticles may be released from the wax, resulting in homogenous instead of Janus nanoparticles. This can partially be corrected by using waxes with higher melting points or performing functionalization at lower temperatures. However, these modifications still result in significant loss. Cui et al. designed a more enduring mask made of polydimethylsiloxane (PDMS) polymer film to create a liquid–liquid/liquid–solid interface. The exposed-to-be-modified portion of particle surface can be adjusted by controlling the PDMS curing temperature and time, thus the embedment depth of the particles. The advantage of this fabrication method is that PDMS is inert and enduring in many wet chemistry solutions, and various metal or oxides or alloys such as silver, gold, nickel, titania can modify the exposed surface. Granick et al., in another paper, demonstrated a possible fix by using a liquid–liquid/gas–solid phase hybrid method by first immobilizing silica nanoparticles in paraffin wax using the previously discussed liquid–solid phase interface method, and then filtering off the water. The resulting immobilized nanoparticles were then exposed to silanol vapor produced by bubbling nitrogen or argon gas through liquid silanol, causing the formation of a hydrophilic face. The wax was then dissolved in chloroform, releasing the Janus nanoparticles.

An example of a more traditional liquid–solid technique has been described by Sardar et al. by beginning with the immobilization of gold nanoparticles on a silanized glass surface. Then the glass surface was exposed to 11-mercapto-1-undecanol, which bonded to the exposed hemispheres of the gold nanoparticles. The nanoparticles were then removed from the slide using ethanol containing 16-mercaptohexadecanoic acid, which functionalized the previously masked hemispheres of the nanoparticles.

=== Self-assembly ===
==== Block copolymers ====
Schematic representation of the synthesis of Janus nanoparticles using the block copolymer self-assembly method

This method uses the well-studied methods of producing block copolymers with well-defined geometries and compositions across a large variety of substrates. Synthesis of Janus particles by self-assembly via block copolymers was first described in 2001 by Erhardt et al. They produced a triblock polymer from polymethylacrylate, polystyrene and low-molecular-weight polybutadiene. The polystyrene and polymethylacrylate formed alternating layers in between which polybutadiene sat in nanosized spheres. The blocks were then cross-linked and dissolved in THF, and after several washing steps, yielded spherical Janus particles with polystyrene on one face and polymethylacrylate on the other, with a polybutadiene core. The production of Janus spheres, cylinders, sheets, and ribbons is possible using this method by adjusting the molecular weights of the blocks in the initial polymer and also the degree of cross-linking.

==== Competitive adsorption ====
The key aspect of competitive absorption involves two substrates that phase-separate due to one or more opposite physical or chemical properties. When these substrates are mixed with a nanoparticle, typically gold, they maintain their separation and form two faces. A good example of this technique has been demonstrated by Vilain et al., where phosphinine-coated gold nanoparticles were exposed to long-chain thiols, resulting in substitution of the phosphinine ligands in a phase-separated manner to produce Janus nanoparticles. Phase separation was proven by showing the thiols formed one locally pure domain on the nanoparticle using FT-IR. Jakobs et al. demonstrated a major issue with the competitive adsorption method when they attempted to synthesize amphiphilic gold Janus nanoparticles using the competitive adsorption of hydrophobic and hydrophilic thiols. The synthesis demonstrated was quite simple and only involved two steps. First gold nanoparticles capped with tetra-n-octylammonium bromide were produced. Then the capping agent was removed followed by the addition of various ratios of hydrophilic disulfide functionalized ethylene oxide and hydrophobic disulfide functionalized oligo(p-phenylenevinylene). They then attempted to prove that phase separation on the particle surface occurred by comparing the contact angles of water on the surface of a monolayer of the Janus particles with nanoparticles made with only the hydrophobic or hydrophobic ligands. Instead the results of this experiment showed that while there was some phase separation, it was not complete. This result highlights that the ligand choice is extremely important and any changes may result in incomplete phase separation.

=== Phase separation ===
Scheme of the basic principle of phase separation method of producing Janus nanoparticles: Two incompatible substances (A and B) were mixed to form a nanoparticle. A and B then separate into their own domains while still part of a single nanoparticle.

This method involves the mixing of two or more incompatible substances which then separate into their own domains while still part of a single nanoparticle. These methods can involve the production of Janus nanoparticles of two inorganic, as well as two organic, substances.

Typical organic phase separation methods use cojetting of polymers to produce Janus nanoparticles. This technique is exemplified by the work of Yoshid et al. to produce Janus nanoparticles where one hemisphere has affinity for human cells, while the other hemisphere has no affinity for human cells. This was achieved by cojetting polyacrylamide/poly(acrylic acid) copolymers which have no affinity for human cells with biotinylated polyacrylamide/poly(acrylic acid) copolymers, which when exposed to streptavidin-modified antibodies, obtain an affinity for human cells.

The inorganic phase separation methods are diverse and vary greatly depending on the application. The most common method uses the growth of a crystal of one inorganic substance on or from another inorganic nanoparticle. A unique method has been developed by Gu et al., where iron-platinum nanoparticles were coated with sulfur reacted with cadmium acetylacetonate, trioctylphosphineoxide, and hexadecane-1,2-diol at 100 °C to produce nanoparticles with an iron-platinum core and an amorphous cadmium-sulfur shell. The mixture was then heated to 280 °C, resulting in a phase transition and a partial eruption of the Fe-Pt from the core, creating a pure Fe-Pt sphere attached to the CdS-coated nanoparticle. A new method of synthesizing inorganic Janus nanoparticles by phase separation has recently been developed by Zhao and Gao. In this method, they explored the use of the common homogeneous nanoparticle synthetic method of flame synthesis. They found when a methanol solution containing ferric triacetylacetonate and tetraethylorthosilicate was burned, the iron and silicon components formed an intermixed solid, which undergoes phase separation when heated to approximately 1100 °C to produce maghemite-silica Janus nanoparticles. Additionally, they found it was possible to modify the silica after producing the Janus nanoparticles, making it hydrophobic by reacting it with oleylamine.

== Properties and applications ==
=== Task-specific Janus materials ===
The term "task-specific Janus materials" refers to the non-emulsifying roles of Janus particles.

=== Self-assembly behavior of Janus nanoparticles ===
Janus particles' two or more distinct faces give them special properties in solution. In particular, they have been observed to self-assemble in a specific way in aqueous or organic solutions. In the case of spherical Janus micelles having hemispheres of polystyrene (PS) and poly(methyl methacrylate) (PMMA), aggregation into clusters has been observed in various organic solvents, such as tetrahydrofuran. Similarly, Janus discs composed of sides of PS and poly(tert-butyl methacrylate) (PtBMA) can undergo back-to-back stacking into superstructures when in an organic solution. These particular Janus particles form aggregates in organic solvents considering that both sides of these particles are soluble in the organic solvent. It appears that the slight selectivity of the solvent is able to induce self-assembly of the particles into discrete clusters of Janus particles. This type of aggregation does not occur for either standard block copolymers nor for homogeneous particles and thus is a feature specific to Janus particles.

In an aqueous solutions, two kinds of biphasic particles can be distinguished. The first type are particles which are truly amphiphilic and possess one hydrophobic and one hydrophilic side. The second type has two water-soluble, yet chemically distinct, sides. To illustrate the first case, extensive studies have been carried out with spherical Janus particles composed of one hemisphere of water-soluble PMAA and another side of water-insoluble polystyrene. In these studies, the Janus particles were found to aggregate on two hierarchical levels. The first type of self-assembled aggregates look like small clusters, similar to what is found for the case of Janus particles in an organic solution. The second type is noticeably larger than the first and has been termed 'super micelles'. Unfortunately, the structure of the supermicelles is unknown so far; however, they may be similar to multilamellar vesicles.

For the second case of Janus particles which contain two distinct, but still water-soluble sides, the work of Granick's group provides some insight. Their research deals with the clustering of dipolar (zwitterionic), micronsized Janus particles, whose two sides are both fully water-soluble. Zwitterionic Janus particles do not behave like classical dipoles, since their size is much larger than the distance at which electrostatic attractions are strongly felt. The study of zwitterionic Janus particles once again demonstrates their ability to form defined clusters. However, this particular type of Janus particle prefers to aggregate into larger clusters since this is more energetically favorable because each cluster carries a macroscopic dipole which allows the aggregation of already-formed clusters into larger assemblies. Compared to aggregates formed through van der Waals interactions for homogenous particles, the shapes of the zwitterionic Janus nanoclusters are different and the Janus clusters are less dense and more asymmetric.

=== Self-assembly modification using pH ===
The self-assembly of certain types of Janus particles may be controlled by modifying the pH of their solution. Lattuada et al. prepared nanoparticles with one side coated with a pH-responsive polymer (polyacrylic acid, PAA) and the other with either a positively charged polymer (poly dimethylamino ethyl methacrylate, PDMAEMA), a negatively charged, pH-insensitive polymer, or a temperature-responsive polymer (poly-N-isopropyl acrylamide, PNIPAm). In changing the pH of their solution, they noticed a change in the clustering of their Janus nanoparticles. At very high pH values, where PDMAEMA is uncharged while PAA is highly charged, the Janus nanoparticles were very stable in solution. However, below a pH of 4, when PAA is uncharged and PDMAEMA is positively charged, they formed finite clusters. At intermediate pH values, they found that the Janus nanoparticles were unstable due to dipolar interaction between the positively and negatively charged hemispheres.

=== Reversibility of cluster formation and control of cluster size ===
Control of cluster size in the aggregation of Janus nanoparticles has also been demonstrated. Lattuada et al. achieved control of the cluster size of Janus particles with one face PAA and the other either PDMAEMA or PNIPAm by mixing small amounts of these Janus nanoparticles with PAA-coated particles. One unique feature of these clusters was stable particles could be recovered reversibly when high pH conditions were restored. Furthermore, Janus nanoparticles functionalized with PNIPAm showed controlled and reversible aggregation could be achieved by increasing the temperature above the lower critical solubility temperature of PNIPAm.

=== Amphiphilic properties ===
A significant characteristic of Janus nanoparticles is the capability of having both hydrophilic and hydrophobic parts. Many research groups have investigated the surface activities of nanoparticles with amphiphilic properties. In 2006, Janus nanoparticles, made from gold and iron oxides, were compared with their homogeneous counterparts by measuring the ability of the particles to reduce the interfacial tension between water and n-hexane. Experimental results indicated Janus nanoparticles are considerably more surface-active than homogeneous particles of comparable size and chemical nature. Furthermore, increasing the amphiphilic character of the particles can increase the interfacial activity. The ability of Janus nanoparticles to lower interfacial tension between water and n-hexane confirmed previous theoretical predictions on their ability to stabilize Pickering emulsions.

In 2007, the amphiphilic nature of the Janus nanoparticles was examined by measuring the adhesion force between the atomic force microscopy (AFM) tip and the particle surface. The stronger interactions between the hydrophilic AFM tip and the hydrophilic side of the Janus nanoparticles were reflected by a greater adhesion force. The Janus nanoparticles were dropcast onto both hydrophobically and hydrophilically modified substrates. The hydrophobic hemisphere of the Janus particles was exposed when a hydrophilic substrate surface was used, resulting in disparities in adhesion force measurements. Thus, the Janus nanoparticles adopted a conformation that maximized the interactions with the substrate surface.

The nature of amphiphilic Janus nanoparticles to orient themselves spontaneously at the interface between oil and water has been well known. This behavior allows considering amphiphilic Janus nanoparticles as analogues of molecular surfactants for the stabilization of emulsions. In 2005, spherical silica particles with amphiphilic properties were prepared by partial modification of the external surface with an alkylsilane agent. These particles form spherical assemblies encapsulating water-immiscible organic compounds in aqueous media by facing their hydrophobic alkylsilylated side to the inner organic phase and their hydrophilic side to the outer aqueous phase, thus stabilizing oil droplets in water. In 2009, hydrophilic surface of silica particles was made partially hydrophobic by adsorbing cetyltrimethylammonium bromide. These amphiphilic nanoparticles spontaneously assembled at the water-dichloromethane interface. In 2010, Janus particles composed from silica and polystyrene, with the polystyrene portion loaded with nanosized magnetite particles, were used to form kinetically stable oil-in-water emulsions that can be spontaneously broken on application of an external magnetic field. Such Janus materials will find applications in magnetically controlled optical switches and other related areas. The first real applications of Janus nanoparticles were in polymer synthesis. In 2008, spherical amphiphilic Janus nanoparticles, having one polystyrene and one poly(methyl methacrylate) side, were shown to be effective as compatibilizing agents of multigram scale compatibilization of two immiscible polymer blends, polystyrene and poly(methyl methacrylate). The Janus nanoparticles oriented themselves at the interface of the two polymer phases, even under high temperature and shear conditions, allowing the formation of much smaller domains of poly(methyl methacrylate) in a polystyrene phase. The performance of the Janus nanoparticles as compatibilizing agents was significantly superior to other state-of-the-art compatibilizers, such as linear block copolymers.

=== Stabilizers in emulsions ===
A similar application of Janus nanoparticles as stabilizers was shown in emulsion polymerization. In 2008, spherical amphiphilic Janus nanoparticles were applied for the first time to the emulsion polymerization of styrene and n-butyl acrylate. The polymerization did not require additives or miniemulsion polymerization techniques, as do other Pickering emulsion polymerizations. Also, by applying Janus nanoparticles, the emulsion polymerization produced very well-controlled particle sizes with low polydispersities.

=== Janus interphase catalyst ===
Janus interphase catalyst is a new generation of heterogeneous catalysts, which is capable to do organic reactions on the interface of two phases via the formation of Pickering emulsion.

=== Catalyst in hydrogen peroxide decomposition ===
In 2007, spherical polystyrene Janus nano-particles with one side coated with platinum were used for the first time to catalyze the decomposition of hydrogen peroxide (H_{2}O_{2}). The platinum particle catalyzes the surface chemical reaction: 2H_{2}O_{2} → O_{2} + 2H_{2}O. The decomposition of hydrogen peroxide created Janus catalytic nano-motors, the motion of which was analyzed experimentally and theoretically using analytical techniques and computer simulations. The motion of the spherical Janus nano-particles was found to agree with the predictions of theoretical findings. Ultimately, catalytic nano-motors have practical applications in delivering chemical payloads in microfluidic chips, eliminating pollution in aquatic media, removing toxic chemicals within biological systems, and performing medical procedures.

In 2013, based on the computer simulation results it has been shown that self-propelled Janus particles can be used for direct demonstration of the non-equilibrium phenomenon, ratchet effect. Ratcheting of Janus particles can be orders of magnitude stronger than for ordinary thermal potential ratchets and thus easily experimentally accessible. In particular, autonomous pumping of a large mixture of passive particles can be induced by just adding a small fraction of Janus particles.

=== Water-repellent fibers ===
In 2011, Janus nanoparticles were shown to be applicable in textiles. Water-repellent fibers can be prepared by coating polyethylene terephthalate fabric with amphiphilic spherical Janus nanoparticles. The Janus particles bind with the hydrophilic reactive side of the textile surface, while the hydrophobic side is exposed to the environment, thus providing the water-repellent behavior. A Janus particle size of 200 nm was found to deposit on the surface of fibers and were very efficient for the design of water-repellent textiles.

=== Applications in biological sciences ===
The groundbreaking progress in the biological sciences has led to a drive towards custom made materials with precisely designed physical/chemical properties at the nanoscale level. Inherently Janus nanoparticles play a crucial role in such applications. In 2009, a new type of bio-hybrid material composed of Janus nanoparticles with spatially controlled affinity towards human endothelial cells was reported. These nanoparticles were synthesized by selective surface modification with one hemisphere exhibiting high binding affinity for human endothelial cells and the other hemisphere being resistant towards cell binding. The Janus nanoparticles were fabricated via electrohydrodynamic jetting of two polymer liquid solutions. When incubated with human endothelial cells, these Janus nanoparticles exhibited expected behavior, where one face binds toward human endothelial cells, while the other face was not bonding. These Janus nanoparticles not only bound to the top of the human endothelial cells, but also associated all around the perimeter of cells forming a single particle lining. The biocompatibility between the Janus nanoparticles and cells was excellent. The concept is to eventually design probes based on Janus nanoparticles to attain directional information about cell-particle interactions.

==== Nanocorals ====
In 2010, a new type of cellular probe synthesized from Janus nanoparticles called a nanocoral, combining cellular specific targeting and biomolecular sensing, was presented. Nanocoral is composed of polystyrene and gold hemispheres. The polystyrene hemisphere of the nanocoral was selectively functionalized with antibodies to target receptors of specific cells. This was demonstrated by functionalizing the polystyrene region with antibodies that specifically attached to breast cancer cells. The gold region of the nanocoral surface was used for detecting and imaging. Thus, the targeting and sensing mechanisms were decoupled and could be separately engineered for a particular experiment. Additionally, the polystyrene region may also be used as a carrier for drugs and other chemicals by surface hydrophobic adsorption or encapsulation, making the nanocoral a possible multifunctional nanosensor.

==== Imaging and magnetolytic therapy ====
Also in 2010, Janus nanoparticles synthesized from hydrophobic magnetic nanoparticles on one side and poly(styrene-block-allyl alcohol) on the other side were used for imaging and magnetolytic therapy. The magnetic side of the Janus nanoparticles responded well to external magnetic stimuli. The nanoparticles were quickly attached to the cell surfaces using a magnetic field. Magnetolytic therapy was achieved through magnetic field-modulated cell membrane damage. First, the nanoparticles were brought close in contact with the tumor cells, and then a spinning magnetic field was applied. After 15 minutes, the majority of the tumor cells were killed. Magnetic Janus nanoparticles could serve as the basis for potential applications in medicine and electronics. Quick responses to external magnetic fields could become an effective approach for targeted imaging, therapy in vitro and in vivo, and cancer treatment. Similarly, a quick response to magnetic fields is also desirable to fabricate smart displays, opening new opportunities in electronics and spintronics.

In 2011, silica-coated Janus nanoparticles, composed of silver oxide and iron oxide (Fe_{2}O_{3}), were prepared in one step with scalable flame aerosol technology. These hybrid plasmonic-magnetic nanoparticles bear properties that are applicable in bioimaging, targeted drug delivery, in vivo diagnosis, and therapy. The purpose of the nanothin SiO_{2} shell was to reduce the release of toxic Ag^{+} ions from the nanoparticle surface to live cells. As a result, these hybrid nanoparticles showed no cyctotoxicity during bioimaging and remained stable in suspension with no signs of agglomeration or settling, thus enabling these nanoparticles as biocompatible multifunctional probes for bioimaging. Next, by labeling their surfaces and selectively binding them on the membrane of live-tagged Raji and HeLa cells, this demonstrated the nanoparticles as biomarkers and their detection under dark-field illumination was achieved. These new hybrid Janus nanoparticles overcame the individual limitations of Fe_{2}O_{3} (poor particle stability in suspension) and of Ag (toxicity) nanoparticles, while retaining the desired magnetic properties of Fe_{2}O_{3} and the plasmonic optical properties of Ag.

=== Applications in electronics ===
The potential application of Janus particles was first demonstrated by Nisisako et al., who made use of the electrical anisotropy of Janus particles filled with white and black pigments in both hemispheres. These particles were used to make switchable screens by placing a thin layer of these spheres between two electrodes. Upon changing the applied electric field, the particles orient their black sides to the anode and their white sides to the cathode. Thus the orientation and the color of the display can be changed by simply reversing the electric field. With this method, it may be possible to make very thin and environmentally friendly displays.

Graphene Janus particles have been used in experimental sodium-ion batteries to increase energy density. One side provides interaction sites while the other provides inter-layer separation. Energy density reached 337 mAh/g.

== See also ==
- Microswimmer
- Active Brownian particle
