= Ginestra (disambiguation) =

Ginestra may refer to:

- Ginestra, an Arbëreshë town and comune in the province of Potenza, Basilicata, Italy
- Ginestra degli Schiavoni, municipality in the province of Benevento in the Italian region Campania, Italy
- Ginestra (torrent), stream in Southern Apennines, Italy
- Ginestra Bianconi, network scientist and mathematical physicist
- Ginestra (surname), Italian surname
- 8716 Ginestra, a minor planet

== See also ==
- Genista, a genus of flowering plants in the legume family Fabaceae
