= Fitness model =

Fitness model can mean:

- Fitness model (person), a person who models, with emphasis on their physique
- Fitness model (network theory), a model of network evolution
