= Fitness model (network theory) =

In complex network theory, the fitness model is a model of the evolution of a network: how the links between nodes change over time depends on the fitness of nodes. Fitter nodes attract more links at the expense of less fit nodes.

It has been used to model the network structure of the World Wide Web.

== Description of the model ==
The model is based on the idea of fitness, an inherent competitive factor that nodes may have, capable of affecting the network's evolution. According to this idea, the nodes' intrinsic ability to attract links in the network varies from node to node, the most efficient (or "fit") being able to gather more edges in the expense of others. In that sense, not all nodes are identical to each other, and they claim their degree increase according to the fitness they possess every time. The fitness factors of all the nodes composing the network may form a distribution ρ(η) characteristic of the system been studied.

Ginestra Bianconi and Albert-László Barabási proposed a new model called Bianconi-Barabási model, a variant to the Barabási-Albert model (BA model), where the probability for a node to connect to another one is supplied with a term expressing the fitness of the node involved. The fitness parameter is time-independent and is multiplicative to the probability.

Fitness model where fitnesses are not coupled to preferential attachment has been introduced by Caldarelli et al. Here a link is created between two vertices $i,j$ with a probability given by a linking function $f(\eta_i,\eta_j)$ of the fitnesses of the vertices involved. The degree of a vertex i is given by:

$$k(\eta_i)=N\int_0^\infty \!\!\! f(\eta_i,\eta_j) \rho(\eta_j) d\eta_j$$

If $k(\eta_i)$ is an invertible and increasing function of $\eta_i$, then the probability distribution $P(k)$ is given by

$$P(k)=\rho(\eta(k)) \cdot \eta'(k)$$

As a result if the fitnesses $\eta$ are distributed as a power law, then also the node degree does.

Less intuitively with a fast decaying probability distribution as $\rho(\eta)=e^{-\eta}$ together with a linking function of the kind

$$f(\eta_i,\eta_j)=\Theta(\eta_i+\eta_j-Z)$$

with $Z$ a constant and $\Theta$ the Heavyside function, we also obtain scale-free networks.

Such model has been successfully applied to describe trade between nations by using GDP as fitness for the various nodes $i,j$ and a linking function of the kind;

$$\frac{\delta \eta_i\eta_j}{1+ \delta \eta_i\eta_j}$$

== Fitness model and the evolution of the Web ==
The fitness model has been used to model the network structure of the World Wide Web. In a PNAS article, Kong et al. extended the fitness model to include random node deletion, a common phenomena in the Web. When the deletion rate of the web pages are accounted for, they found that the overall fitness distribution is exponential. Nonetheless, even this small variance in the fitness is amplified through the preferential attachment mechanism, leading to a heavy-tailed distribution of incoming links on the Web.

== See also ==
- Bose–Einstein condensation: a network theory approach
