= Activity-driven model =

In network science, the activity-driven model is a temporal network model in which each node has a randomly-assigned "activity potential", which governs how it links to other nodes over time.

Each node $j$ (out of $N$ total) has its activity potential $x_i$ drawn from a given distribution $F(x)$. A sequence of timesteps unfolds, and in each timestep each node $j$ forms ties to $m$ random other nodes at rate $a_i=\eta x_i$ (more precisely, it does so with probability $a_i \, \Delta t$ per timestep). All links are then deleted after each timestep.

Properties of time-aggregated network snapshots are able to be studied in terms of $F(x)$. For example, since each node $j$ after $T$ timesteps will have on average $m\eta x_i T$ outgoing links, the degree distribution after $T$ timesteps in the time-aggregated network will be related to the activity-potential distribution by

$$P_T(k) \propto F\left(\frac{k}{m\eta T}\right).$$

Spreading behavior according to the SIS epidemic model was investigated on activity-driven networks, and the following condition was derived for large-scale outbreaks to be possible:

$$\frac{\beta}{\lambda} > \frac{2\langle a\rangle}{\langle a\rangle + \sqrt{\langle a^2\rangle}},$$

where $\beta$ is the per-contact transmission probability, $\lambda$ is the per-timestep recovery probability, and ($\langle a\rangle$, $\langle a^2\rangle$) are the first and second moments of the random activity-rate $a_j$.

== Extensions ==
A variety of extensions to the activity-driven model have been studied. One example is activity-driven networks with attractiveness, in which the links that a given node forms do not attach to other nodes at random, but rather with a probability proportional to a variable encoding nodewise attractiveness. Another example is activity-driven networks with memory, in which activity-levels change according to a self-excitation mechanism.
