= Simon model =

In applied probability theory, the Simon model is a class of stochastic models that results in a power-law distribution function. It was proposed by Herbert A. Simon to account for the wide range of empirical distributions following a power-law. It models the dynamics of a system of elements with associated counters (e.g., words and their frequencies in texts, or nodes in a network and their connectivity $k$). In this model the dynamics of the system is based on constant growth via addition of new elements (new instances of words) as well as incrementing the counters (new occurrences of a word) at a rate proportional to their current values.

== Description ==
To model this type of network growth as described above, Bornholdt and Ebel considered a network with $n$ nodes, and each node with connectivities $k_i$, $i = 1, \ldots, n$. These nodes form classes $[k]$ of $f(k)$ nodes with identical connectivity $k$. Repeat the following steps:

1. With probability $\alpha$ add a new node and attach a link to it from an arbitrarily chosen node.
2. With probability $1-\alpha$ add one link from an arbitrary node to a node $j$ of class $[k]$ chosen with a probability proportional to $k f(k)$.

For this stochastic process, Simon found a stationary solution exhibiting power-law scaling, $P(k) \propto k^{- \gamma}$, with exponent $\gamma = 1 + \frac{1}{1- \alpha}.$

== Properties ==
1. Barabási-Albert (BA) model can be mapped to the subclass $\alpha= 1/2$ of Simon's model, when using the simpler probability for a node being connected to another node $i$ with connectivity $k_i$ $P(\mathrm{new\ link\ to\ } i) \propto k_i$ (same as the preferential attachment at BA model). In other words, the Simon model describes a general class of stochastic processes that can result in a scale-free network, appropriate to capture Pareto and Zipf's laws.
2. The only free parameter of the model $\alpha$ reflects the relative growth of number of nodes versus the number of links. In general $\alpha$ has small values; therefore, the scaling exponents can be predicted to be $\gamma\approx 2$. For instance, Bornholdt and Ebel studied the linking dynamics of World Wide Web, and predicted the scaling exponent as $\gamma \approx 2.1$, which was consistent with observation.
3. The interest in the scale-free model comes from its ability to describe the topology of complex networks. The Simon model does not have an underlying network structure, as it was designed to describe events whose frequency follows a power-law. Thus network measures going beyond the degree distribution such as the average path length, spectral properties, and clustering coefficient, cannot be obtained from this mapping.

The Simon model is related to generalized scale-free models with growth and preferential attachment properties. For more reference, see.

== See also ==
- Price's model
