= Réka Albert =

Romanian-Hungarian scientist

- Born: 2 March 1972 (age 54); Reghin, Romania
- Education: Babeș-Bolyai University (B.S., M.S.), University of Notre Dame (Ph.D.)
- Known for: Barabási–Albert model
- Awards: Sloan Research Fellow (2004); NSF CAREER Award (2007); Fellow of the American Physical Society (2010); Maria Goeppert-Mayer Award (2011); External member of the Hungarian Academy of Sciences (2016); Fellow of the Network Science Society (2018); Fellow of the American Association for the Advancement of Science (2019)
- Scientific career
- Fields: Network Science
- Workplaces: Pennsylvania State University

Réka Albert (born 2 March 1972) is a Romanian-Hungarian scientist. She is a distinguished professor of physics and adjunct professor of biology at Pennsylvania State University and is noted for the Barabási–Albert model and research into scale-free networks and Boolean modeling of biological systems. She was elected a Member of the National Academy of Sciences in 2025.

== Education ==
Albert was born in Reghin, a city in Mureș County, located in the historical region of Transylvania, in the north-central part of Romania. She obtained her B.S. and M.S. degrees from Babeș-Bolyai University in Cluj-Napoca, Romania, in 1995 and 1996, respectively. She earned her Ph.D. at the University of Notre Dame in 2001.

== Work ==
Albert is co-creator, together with Albert-László Barabási, of the Barabási–Albert model for generating scale-free random graphs via preferential attachment (see Barabási–Albert model).

Her work extends to networks in a very general sense, involving for instance investigations on the error tolerance and attack vulnerability of complex networks and its applications to the vulnerability of the North American power grid.

Her current research focuses on dynamic modeling of biological networks and systems biology.

== Awards ==
Albert was selected as a Sloan Research Fellow in 2004 and was awarded a National Science Foundation CAREER Award in 2007. She was named Fellow of the American Physical Society in 2010. One year later she received the Maria Goeppert-Mayer Award. In 2016 she was inducted as an external member of the Hungarian Academy of Sciences. She was elected Fellow of the Network Science Society in 2018 and a Fellow of the American Association for the Advancement of Science in 2019.

== Selected publications ==
- Albert R., Barabási A.-L.: Statistical mechanics of complex networks, Reviews of Modern Physics, Vol. 74, Nr. 1, pp. 47–97, 2002, doi:10.1103/RevModPhys.74.47, arXiv:cond-mat/0106096v1 (submitted 6 June 2001)
- Jeong H., Tombor B., Albert R., Oltvai Z.N., Barabási A.-L.: The large-scale organization of metabolic networks, Nature 407, pp. 651–654, 2000, doi:10.1038/35036627 arXiv:cond-mat/0010278 (submitted 19 October 2000)
- Albert R., Jeong H., Barabási A.-L.: Error and attack tolerance of complex networks, Nature 406, pp. 378–382, 2000, doi:10.1038/35019019, arXiv:cond-mat/0008064v1 (submitted 3 August 2000)
- Barabási A.-L., Albert R.: Emergence of scaling in random networks, Science, Vol. 286, Nr. 5439, pp. 509–12, 15 October 1999, doi:10.1126/science.286.5439.509, arXiv:cond-mat/9910332v1 (submitted 21 October 1999)
