= Link-centric preferential attachment =

In mathematical modeling of social networks, link-centric preferential attachment is a node's propensity to re-establish links to nodes it has previously been in contact with in time-varying networks. This preferential attachment model relies on nodes keeping memory of previous neighbors up to the current time.

== Background ==
In real social networks individuals exhibit a tendency to re-connect with past contacts (ex. family, friends, co-workers, etc.) rather than strangers. In 1970, Mark Granovetter examined this behaviour in the social networks of a group of workers and identified tie strength, a characteristic of social ties describing the frequency of contact between two individuals. From this comes the idea of strong and weak ties, where an individual's strong ties are those she has come into frequent contact with. Link-centric preferential attachment aims to explain the mechanism behind strong and weak ties as a stochastic reinforcement process for old ties in agent-based modeling where nodes have long-term memory.

== Examples ==
In a simple model for this mechanism, a node's propensity to establish a new link can be characterized solely by $n$, the number of contacts it has had in the past. The probability for a node with n social ties to establish a new social tie could then be simply given by

$$P(n) = {c\over n+c} \,$$

where c is an offset constant. The probability for a node to re-connect with old ties is then

$$1 - P(n) = {n\over n+c}.$$

Figure 1. shows an example of this process: in the first step nodes A and C connect to node B, giving B a total of two social ties. With c = 1, in the next step B has a probability P(2) = 1/(2 + 1) = 1/3 to create a new tie with D, whereas the probability to reconnect with A or C is twice that at 2/3.

More complex models may take into account other variables, such as frequency of contact, contact and intercontact duration, as well as short term memory effects.

Effects on the spreading of contagions / weakness of strong ties

Understanding the evolution of a network's structure and how it can influence dynamical processes has become an important part of modeling the spreading of contagions. In models of social and biological contagion spreading on time-varying networks link-centric preferential attachment can alter the spread of the contagion to the entire population. Compared to the classic rumour spreading process where nodes are memory-less, link-centric preferential attachment can cause not only a slower spread of the contagion but also one less diffuse. In these models an infected node's chances of connecting to new contacts diminishes as their size of their social circle $n$ grows leading to a limiting effect on the growth of n. The result is strong ties with a node's early contacts and consequently the weakening of the diffusion of the contagion.

== See also ==
- BA model
- Network science
- Interpersonal tie
