= Scientific collaboration network =

A scientific collaboration network is a social network where nodes are scientists and links are co-authorships, as the latter is one of the most well documented forms of scientific collaboration. It is an undirected, scale-free network where the degree distribution follows a power law with an exponential cutoff – most authors are sparsely connected while a few authors are intensively connected. The network has an assortative nature – hubs tend to link to other hubs and low-degree nodes tend to link to low-degree nodes. Assortativity is not structural, meaning that it is not a consequence of the degree distribution, but it is generated by some process that governs the network’s evolution.

== Study by Mark Newman ==
A detailed reconstruction of an actual collaboration was made by Mark Newman. He analyzed the collaboration networks through several large databases in the fields of biology and medicine, physics and computer science in a five-year window (1995–1999). The results showed that these networks form small worlds, in which randomly chosen pairs of scientists are typically separated by only a short path of intermediate acquaintances. They also suggest that the networks are highly clustered, i.e. two scientists are much more likely to have collaborated if they have a third common collaborator than are two scientists chosen randomly from the community.

== Prototype of evolving networks ==
Barabasi et al. studied the collaboration networks in mathematics and neuro-science of an 8-year period (1991–1998) to understand the topological and dynamical laws governing complex networks. They viewed the collaboration network as a prototype of evolving networks, as it expands by the addition of new nodes (authors) and new links (papers co-authored). The results obtained indicated that the network is scale-free and that its evolution is governed by preferential attachment. Moreover, authors concluded that most quantities used to characterize the network are time dependent. For example, the average degree (network's interconnectedness) increases in time. Furthermore, the study showed that the node separation decreases over time, however this trend is believed to be offered by incomplete database and it can be opposite in the full system.
