= Parable of the Talents =

Parable taught by Jesus according to Christian gospels

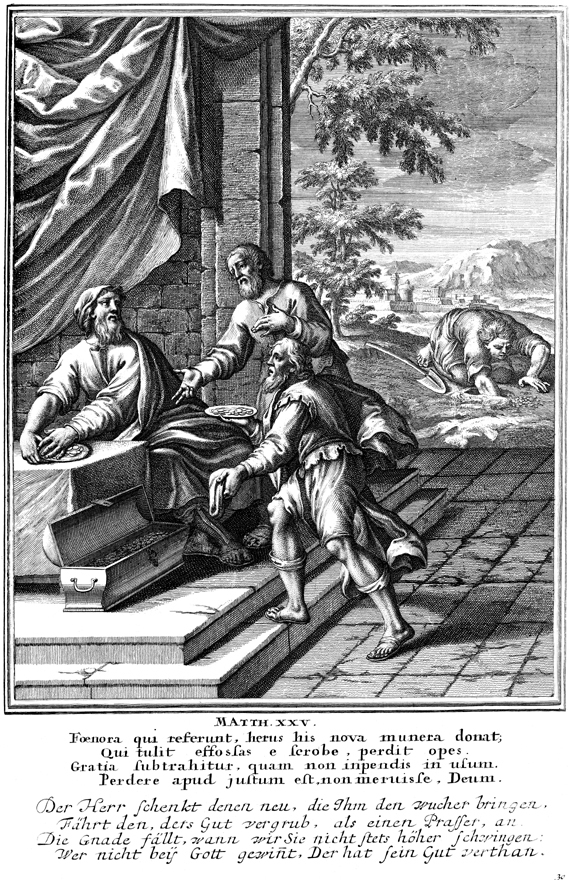
The parable of the talents, depicted in a 1712 woodcut. The lazy servant searches for his buried talent, while the two other servants present their earnings to their master.

The Parable of the Talents (also the Parable of the Minas) is one of the parables of Jesus. It appears in two of the synoptic, canonical gospels of the New Testament:

- Matthew 25:14–30
- Luke 19:11–27

Although the basic theme of each of these parables is essentially the same, the differences between the parables in the Gospel of Matthew and in the Gospel of Luke are sufficient to indicate that the parables are not derived from the same source. In Matthew, the opening words link the parable to the preceding Parable of the Ten Virgins, which refers to the Kingdom of Heaven. The version in Luke is also called the Parable of the Pounds.

In both Matthew and Luke, a master puts his servants in charge of his goods while he is away on a trip. Upon his return, the master assesses the stewardship of his servants. He evaluates them according to how faithful each was in making wise investments of his goods to obtain a profit. It is clear that the master sought some profit from the servants' oversight. A gain indicated faithfulness on the part of the servant. The master rewards his servant according to how each has handled his stewardship. He judges two servants as having been "faithful" and gives them a positive reward. To the single "unfaithful" servant, who avoided even the safe profit of bank interest, a negative compensation is given.

A thematically variant parable may have appeared in the non-canonical Jewish–Christian Gospels, wherein one servant squanders the money on prostitutes and flute-girls, the second multiplies its value, and the third hides it.

== Settings ==
While the basic story in each of these parables is essentially the same, the settings are quite different.

- The setting of the parable of the talents in Matthew 25 is the Mt. Olivet discourse. In Matthew 24–25, the overall theme is end-time events, warning, and parables. "The direct cautions and warnings (Matthew 24:42, Matthew 24:44; Matthew 25:13) must be for the disciples (his audience)—warnings to be watchful and to be ready for Christ's coming".
- The setting of the parable of the minas in Luke 19 was out in the open among the crowd. Zacchaeus had just believed and the Lord acknowledged his salvation. But, the crowd was now looking for Jesus to set up his kingdom.

== The values of a talent ==
A talent (Ancient Greek τάλαντον, talanton 'scale' and 'balance') was a unit of weight of approximately 80 pounds (36 kg), and when used as a unit of money, was valued for that weight of silver. As a unit of currency, a talent was worth about 6,000 denarii. A denarius was the usual payment for a day's labour. At one denarius per day, a single talent was therefore worth 20 years of labor (assuming a 6-day work week, because nobody would work on the weekly Sabbath).

== Narratives ==
=== Parable of the Talents ===
The "Parable of the Talents", in Matthew 25:14–30 tells of a master who was leaving his house to travel, and, before leaving, entrusted his property to his servants. According to the abilities of each man, one servant received five talents, the second had received two, and the third received only one. The property entrusted to the three servants was worth eight talents, where a talent was a significant amount of money. Upon returning home, after a long absence, the master asks his three servants for an account of the talents he entrusted to them. The first and the second servant explain that they each put their talents to work, and have doubled the value of the property with which they were entrusted; each servant was rewarded:

His master said to him, "Well done, good and trustworthy servant; you have been trustworthy in a few things, I will put you in charge of many things; enter into the joy of your master."

— Matthew 25:23

The third servant, however, had merely hidden his talent, burying it in the ground, and was punished and kicked out by his master:

Then the one who had received the one talent also came forward, saying, "Master, I knew that you were a harsh man, reaping where you did not sow, and gathering where you did not scatter seed; so I was afraid, and I went and hid your talent in the ground. Here you have what is yours." But his master replied, "You wicked and lazy servant! You knew, did you, that I reap where I did not sow, and gather where I did not scatter? Then you ought to have invested my money with the bankers, and on my return I would have received what was my own with interest. So take the talent from him, and give it to the one with the ten talents. For to all those who have, more will be given, and they will have an abundance; but from those who have nothing, even what they have will be taken away. As for this worthless servant, throw him into the outer darkness, where there will be weeping and gnashing of teeth."

— Matthew 25:24–30

=== Parable of the Minas ===
In Luke's Gospel (Luke 19:12–27), Jesus told this parable because he was near Jerusalem and because his disciples thought the kingdom of God would appear immediately. The parable follows on from Zacchaeus' meeting with Jesus and the disciples "hearing" his declaration of restitution to those whom Zacchaeus had defrauded. The objective of investing or trading during the absence of the master was intended to counter expectations of the immediate appearance of God's kingdom. The parable of the minas is generally similar to the parable of the talents, but differences include the inclusion of the motif of a king obtaining a kingdom and the entrusting of ten servants with one mina each, rather than a number of talents (1 talent = 60 minas). Only the business outcomes and consequential rewards of three of the servants' trading were related. Additionally, Luke included at the beginning an account of citizens sending a message after the nobleman to say that they did not want him as their ruler; and, at the end, Luke added that the nobleman instructed that his opponents should be brought to him and slain, as well as the unprofitable servant deprived of his mina.

The parallels between the Lukan material (the Gospel of Luke and Book of Acts) and Josephus' writings have long been noted. The core idea, of a man traveling to a far country being related to a kingdom, has vague similarities to Herod Archelaus traveling to Rome in order to be given his kingdom; although this similarity is not in itself significant, Josephus' account also contains details which are echoed by features of the Lukan parable. Josephus describes Jews sending an embassy to Augustus, while Archelaus is travelling to Rome, to complain that they do not want Archelaus as their ruler; when Archelaus returns, he arranges for 3,000 of his enemies to be brought to him at the Temple in Jerusalem, where he has them slaughtered.

== Version in the Gospel of the Hebrews ==
A fragment attributed to Eusebius of Caesarea includes a paraphrased summary of a parable of talents taken from a "Gospel written in Hebrew script" (generally considered in modern times to be the Gospel of the Nazarenes); this gospel is presumed to have been destroyed in the destruction of the Theological Library of Caesarea Maritima in the 7th century (in historically controversial circumstances) and has yet to be found. In that gospel, the author of the fragment writes that one servant "consumed the property of the master with prostitutes and flute-girls", one "greatly increased the profit", and the third "hid the talent". One of them was "accepted", one was "merely censured", and one was "locked up in prison". The author of the fragment suggests that the punishment may have been addressed towards the first servant, although the text is unclear.

== Depositing funds with the bankers ==
The third slave in Matthew's version was condemned as wicked and lazy because he could have deposited his talent with the bankers (Greek: τραπεζιταις, trapezitais, literally, table or counter-keepers, just as bankers were originally those who sat at their bancum, or bench). The Cambridge Bible for Schools and Colleges notes that this was "the very least the slave could have done, [as] to make money in this way required no personal exertion or intelligence", and Johann Bengel commented that the labour of digging a hole and burying the talent was greater than the labour involved in going to the bankers.

== Interpretations ==
In Matthew, the opening words appear to link the parable to the parable of the Ten Virgins, which immediately precedes it. That parable deals with wisdom in an eschatological context. This parable, however, has been interpreted in several ways.

=== As a teaching for Christian believers ===
==== As personal abilities ====
Traditionally, the parable of the talents has been seen as an exhortation to Jesus' disciples to use their God-given gifts in the service of God, and to take risks for the sake of the Kingdom of God. These gifts have been seen to include personal abilities ("talents" in the everyday sense), as well as personal wealth. Failure to use one's gifts, the parable suggests, will result in negative judgment. From a psychological point of view, the failure is the immediate result of the failure of feeling God's love. The first two servants are able to see God in a positive perception, as understanding, generous, and kind, while the third servant sees God as harsh, demanding, and critical.

Finley suggests these interpretations among the teachings for Christians:

- The nobleman (Lk 19:12), or the man (Matthew 25:14) is Christ.
- The journey of the master to another place and his return (Matt 25:14–15, Matthew 24:19; Luke 19:12, Luke 19:15) speaks of Christ's going away to Heaven at his ascension and his return as the time when he comes again.
- His entrustment to his servants of his possessions while he is away on his journey should be Christ's gifts and various possessions ("capital") given to the believers in his church in anticipation of them producing a spiritual "profit" for Him in the kingdom of God. While he is away, he expects his believers to "'Do business with this until I come back.'" (Luke 19:13).
- His evaluation of the business they have conducted during his absence takes place upon his return and is an account of their activity (Matt 25:19; Luke 19:15). This must be the Judgment Seat of Christ, which is only for believers. This pictures an evaluation of stewardship.
- The positive rewards for two of the servants are based upon their faithfulness to properly use what Christ entrusted to them. This probably speaks of positive reward for believers who are faithful to serve Christ.
- The negative reward (recompense) for the unfaithful servant likely speaks of some negative dealing by Christ with an unfaithful believer.

The poet John Milton was fascinated by the parable (interpreted in this traditional sense), referring to it repeatedly, notably in the sonnet "When I Consider How My Light is Spent":

When I consider how my light is spent
Ere half my days, in this dark world and wide,
And that one Talent, which is death to hide,
Lodg'd with me useless, though my Soul more bent
To serve therewith my Maker, and present
My true account, lest he returning chide;
"Doth God exact day-labour, light denied?"
I fondly ask. But Patience to prevent'
That murmur, soon replies: "God doth not need
Either man's work or his own gifts; who best
Bear his mild yoke, they serve him best. His state
Is kingly. Thousands at his bidding speed
And post o'er land and ocean without rest:
They also serve who only stand and wait."

Some critics interpret the poem's exhortation to be ready to receive God's will as a critique of a misunderstanding of the parable as literal or economic, and that waiting, rather than amassing wealth to prove one's worth, is the proper way to serve God. While the narrator worries over his limited accomplishments, Patience reminds him that God does not need "man's work". Milton may even be contrasting God (as King) with the lord of the parable.

==== As love or mercy ====
Catholic bishop Robert Barron says that the talents in this parable are "a share in the mercy of God, a participation in the weightiness of the divine love," rather than personal abilities or wealth. He utilizes the interpretation of Old Testament professor Robert Schoenstene, who argues that a talent in ancient Jewish times was very weighty thus five talents was extremely heavy. Such heaviness would remind to the heaviest weight of all, the kabod (lit. heaviness) of God in the Temple of Jerusalem, accordingly the most heavy of all is the mercy of God. Similarly, a reflection in the Carmelites' website defines the talents as "love, service, sharing", the "money of the master". In other words, Erasmo Leiva-Merikakis says, "Our greatest talent and treasure is our ability to love, and in this enterprise the champion is the greatest risk taker, which means the one most willing to invest himself where the odds appear most against him."

==== As gifts from God ====
Cornelius a Lapide in his great commentary, writes, "By talents understand all the gifts of God, without which we can do nothing. These gifts are, I say—1st Of grace, both making grateful, such as faith, hope, charity, virginity, and all the other virtues, as well as those of grace given gratis—such as the power of working miracles, the Apostolate, the Priesthood, the gift of tongues, prophecy, etc. 2d Natural gifts, such as a keen intellect, a sound judgment, a sound constitution, prudence, industry, learning, eloquence. 3d External goods and gifts, as honours, riches, rank, etc. So St. Chrysostom. For all these things God distributes unequally, according to His good pleasure. And with this end in view, that each should use them for God's glory, and the good of himself and others."

=== As a critique of religious leaders ===
Joachim Jeremias believed that the original meaning of the parable was not an ethical one about every man. Instead, he saw it as aimed at the scribes who had withheld "from their fellow men a due share in God's gift." In his view, Jesus is saying that these scribes will soon be brought to account for what they have done with the Word of God which was entrusted to them.

Jeremias also believed that in the life of the early church the parable took on new meaning, with the merchant having become an allegory of Christ, so that "his journey has become the ascension, his subsequent return ... has become the Parousia, which ushers his own into the Messianic banquet."

=== As social critique ===
In Parables as Subversive Speech: Jesus as Pedagogue of the Oppressed (1994), William R. Herzog II presents a liberation theology interpretation of the "Parable of the Talents", wherein the absentee landlord reaps where he didn't sow, and the third servant is a whistle-blower who has "unmasked the 'joy of the master' for what it is — the profits of exploitation squandered in wasteful excess." Hence, the third servant is punished for speaking the truth, and not for failing to make a profit. From the critical perspective of liberation theology, the message of the "Parable of the Talents" is that man must act in solidarity with other men when confronting social, political, and economic injustices.

To describe how scientists are awarded authorial credit for their work, the sociologists Robert K. Merton and Harriet Zuckerman applied the term "Matthew effect of accumulated advantage", in which the rich get richer and the poor get poorer. With the "Parable of the Talents", they metaphorically described the system of authorial rewards used, among the community of scientists, whereby famous scientists usually are awarded credit that is disproportionately greater than their contributions, while less-famous scientists are awarded lesser credit than is merited by their contributions; see also Stigler's law of eponymy: "No scientific discovery is named after its original discoverer."

== Depictions in the arts ==
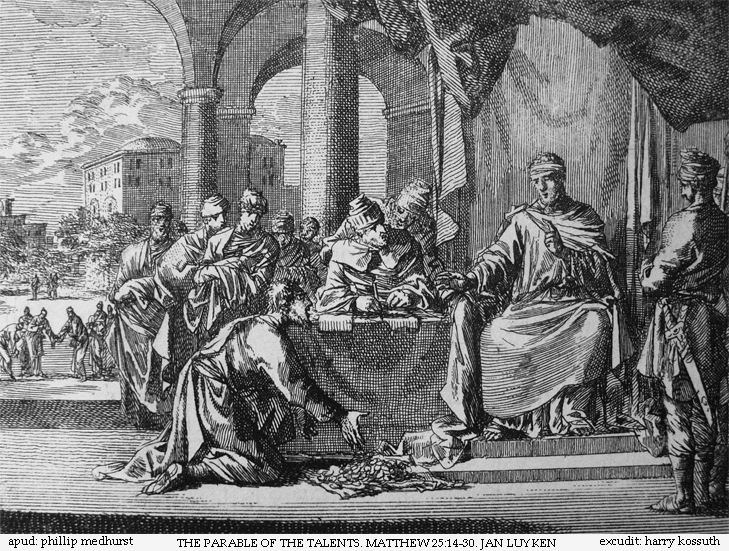
The teachings of Jesus: the Parable of the Talents, as etched by Jan Luyken.

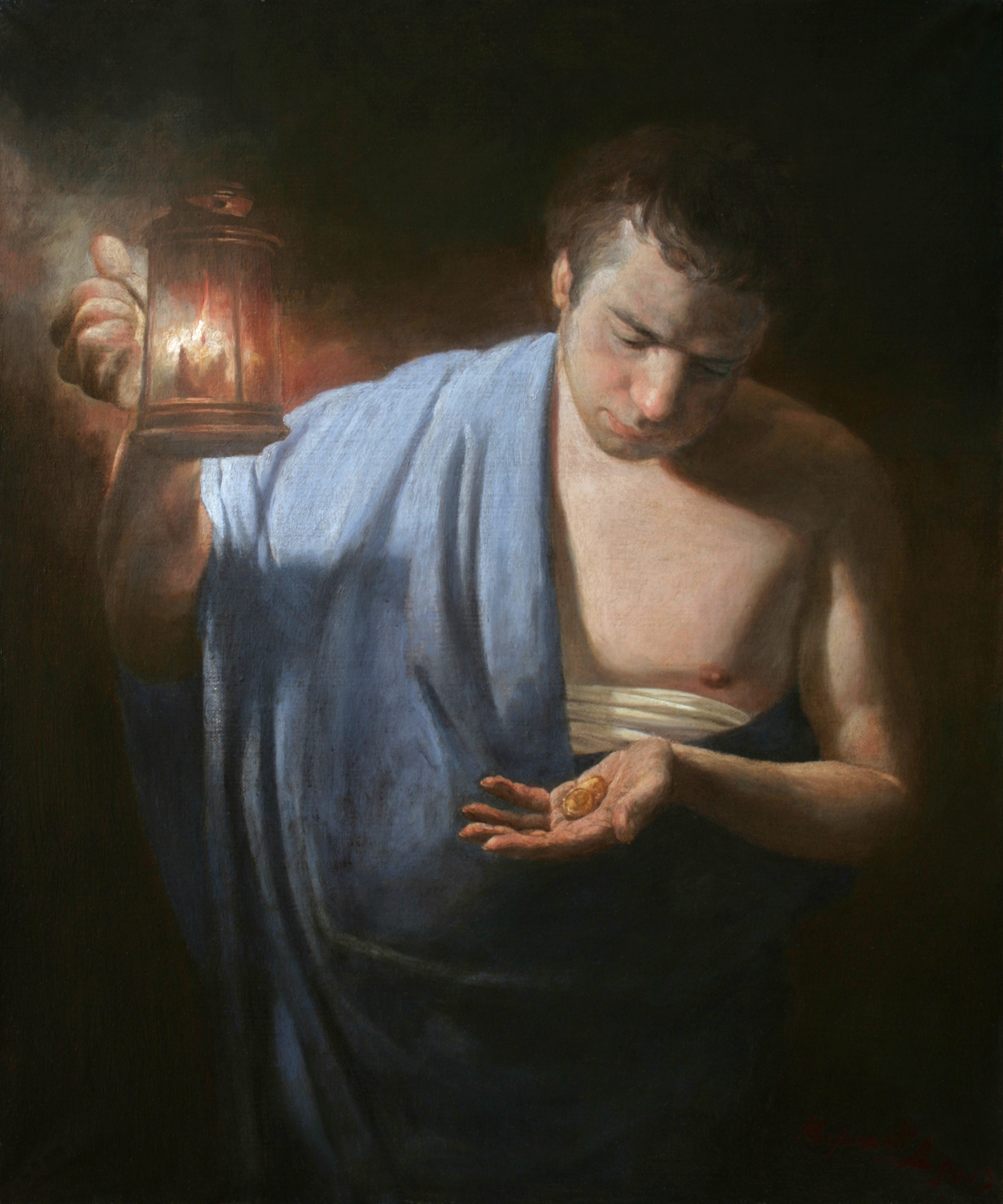
The Parable of the Talents, depicted by artist Andrei Mironov. Oil on canvas, 2013

The "Parable of the Talents" has been depicted by artists such as Rembrandt, Jan Luyken, and Matthäus Merian. In literature, the Threepenny Novel (1934), by Bertolt Brecht (1895–1956), presents a social critique of the parable as an ideological tool of capitalist exploitation of the worker and of society.

In religious music, the hymn "Slave of God, Well Done!", by John Wesley, notably alludes to the "Parable of the Talents" (Matthew 25:23), which was written on the occasion of the death of George Whitefield (1714–1770), the English Anglican cleric who was instrumental to the First Great Awakening (ca. 1731–55) in Britain and in the American colonies.

The hymn "Slave of God, Well Done!" begins thus:

Slave of God, well done!
Thy glorious warfare's past;
The battle's fought, the race is won,
And thou art crowned at last.

Parable of the Talents is a science fiction novel, published in 1998, written by Octavia E. Butler.

== See also ==
- Life of Jesus in the New Testament
- Matthew 25
- Matthew effect
- Ministry of Jesus
- Monasticism
- Sabbath economics
- Stewardship
- Usury
