= Poisson clumping =

Phenomenon of clustered random events

When points are scattered uniformly but randomly over the plane, some clumping inevitably occurs.

Poisson clumping, or Poisson bursts, is a phenomenon where random events may appear to occur in clusters, clumps, or bursts.

== Etymology ==
Poisson clumping is named for 19th-century French mathematician Siméon Denis Poisson, known for his work on definite integrals, electromagnetic theory, and probability theory, and after whom the Poisson distribution is also named.

== History ==
The Poisson process provides a description of random independent events occurring with uniform probability through time and/or space. The expected number λ of events in a time interval or area of a given measure is proportional to that measure. The distribution of the number of events follows a Poisson distribution entirely determined by the parameter λ. If λ is small, events are rare, but may nevertheless occur in clumps—referred to as Poisson clumps or bursts—purely by chance. In many cases there is no other cause behind such indefinite groupings besides the nature of randomness following this distribution. However, obviously not all clumping in nature can be explained by this property. For example, earthquakes tend of to occur in the same area because of local seismic activity that causes groups of local aftershocks; this case, may represent a Weibull distribution instead.

== Applications ==
Poisson clumping is used to explain marked increases or decreases in the frequency of an event, such as shark attacks, "coincidences", birthdays, heads or tails from coin tosses, and e-mail correspondence.

=== Poisson clumping heuristic ===
The poisson clumping heuristic (PCH), published by David Aldous in 1989, is a model for finding first-order approximations over different areas in a large class of stationary probability models. The probability models have a specific monotonicity property with large exclusions. The probability that this will achieve a large value is asymptotically small and is distributed in a Poisson fashion.

== See also ==
- Burstiness
- Clustering illusion
- Texas sharpshooter fallacy
