= Burstiness =

Intermittent increases and decreases in network activity

In temporal networks, burstiness is the intermittent increases and decreases in activity or frequency of an event. One measure of burstiness is the Fano factor—a ratio between the variance and mean of counts.

Burstiness is observable in natural phenomena, such as natural disasters, or other phenomena, such as network/data/email network traffic or vehicular traffic. Burstiness is, in part, due to changes in the probability distribution of inter-event times. Distributions of bursty processes or events are characterised by heavy, or fat, tails.

Burstiness of inter-contact time between nodes in a time-varying network can decidedly slow spreading processes over the network. This is of great interest for studying the spread of information and disease.

== Burstiness score ==
One relatively simple measure of burstiness is burstiness score. The burstiness score of a subset $t$ of time period $T$ relative to an event $e$ is a measure of how often $e$ appears in $t$ compared to its occurrences in $T$. It is defined by

$$\mathrm{Burst}(e, t) = \left (\frac{E_t}{E} - \frac{1}{T}\right )$$

Where $E_t$ is the total number of occurrences of event $e$ in subset $t$ and $E$ is the total number of occurrences of $e$ in $T$.

Burstiness score can be used to determine if $t$ is a "bursty period" relative to $e$. A positive score says that $e$ occurs more often during subset $t$ than over total time $T$, making $t$ a bursty period. A negative score implies otherwise.

== See also ==
- Burst transmission
- Poisson clumping
- Time-varying network
