= Ginestra (surname) =

Ginestra is a surname. Notable people with the surname include:

- Ciro Ginestra (born 1978), Italian footballer and manager
- Paolo Ginestra (born 1979), Italian footballer
