= Harriet Zuckerman =

American sociologist (born 1937)

Harriet A. Zuckerman
- Born: July 19, 1937; New York City, US
- Education: Vassar College, Columbia University
- Awards: Fellow of the American Association for the Advancement of Science (1979) & American Academy of Arts and Sciences (1985).
- Scientific career
- Fields: Sociology of science
- Workplaces: Columbia University, Andrew W. Mellon Foundation

External videos
- Harriet Zuckerman, 20th Anniversary Symposium—Exhibitions Research Teaching: The Bard Graduate Center at Twenty, November 14, 2013.

Harriet Anne Zuckerman (born July 19, 1937) is an American sociologist and professor emerita of Columbia University.

Zuckerman specializes in the sociology of science. She is known for her work on the social organization of science, scientific elites, the accumulation of advantage, the Matthew effect, and the phenomenon of multiple discovery.

Zuckerman served as the Senior Vice President of the Andrew W. Mellon Foundation from 1991 to 2010, overseeing the Foundation's grant program in support of research, libraries and universities. She is known as an authority for her studies of educational programs, and her support of research universities, scholarship in the humanities, graduate educational programs, research libraries, and other centers for advanced study.

== Education ==
Harriet Zuckerman received her A.B. degree from Vassar College in 1958 and her Ph.D. from Columbia University in 1965. She held a Woodrow Wilson Fellowship from 1958 to 1959.

== Career ==
Zuckerman was a lecturer in sociology at Barnard College in New York City from 1964 to 1965. She returned to Columbia University an assistant professor of sociology in 1965, where she served as Project Director of the Bureau of Applied Social Research. She became an associate professor in 1972, and a Full Professor in 1978 . She chaired the Sociology department from 1978 to 1982. In 1992, she retired from Columbia University, becoming a professor emerita.

Zuckerman served as president of the Society for Social Studies of Science in 1990–1991. In 1989, she joined the Andrew W. Mellon Foundation as a senior advisor, becoming the Senior Vice President in 1991. She retired from the Vice Presidency in May 2010.

== Work ==
Zuckerman's research has focused on the social organization of science and scholarship. She is the author of the 1977 book, Scientific Elite: Nobel Laureates in the United States, which has been credited with defining the direction of work in the field for the next two decades. As a basis for her research, Zuckerman used a database to examine more than 60,000 academics, in a demonstration of the self-reinforcing dynamics of American academic culture. Zuckerman's findings, particularly her "fundamental notion" of "accumulation of advantage", questioned assumptions about creativity, achievement, eminence, and greatness.

The empirical data Zuckerman analyzed, along with work by Robert K. Merton and others, documented ways in which women scientists were "systematically disadvantaged in educational attainment, productivity, funding, lab space, and recognition". Zuckerman and others have carried out subsequent work on prizes and other rewards; their impact on productivity, collaboration, and authorship; and on the effectiveness of interventions whose intention is to support women and members of other underrepresented populations.

Scientific Elite is an introduction to the phenomenon of multiple discovery in the fields of science and technology. Zuckerman further examined conditions and processes influencing the introduction and adoption of scientific ideas in later work. In 1978, she introduced the idea of "postmature scientific discovery".

To qualify as postmature, for it to evoke surprise from the pertinent scientific community that it was not made earlier, it must have three attributes. In retrospect, it must be judged to have been technically achievable at an earlier time with methods then available. It must be judged to have been understandable, capable of being expressed in terms comprehensible to working scientists at the time, and its implications must have been capable of having been appreciated.--Zuckerman & Lederberg, 1986.

The sociologist of science Robert K. Merton later credited Zuckerman as a co-author of his work on the Matthew effect, writing '"It is now [1973] belatedly evident to me that I drew upon the interview and other materials of the Zuckerman study to such an extent that, clearly, the paper should have appeared under joint authorship." The overlooking of Zuckerman's contribution can be considered an example of a pattern which she noted, which has been nicknamed the Matilda effect by science historian Margaret Rossiter. Zuckerman married Merton in 1993.

== Bibliography ==
- Zuckerman, Harriet (1977). Scientific Elite: Nobel Laureates in the United States. New York: The Free Press.
- Elkana, Yehuda; Lederberg, Joshua; Merton, Robert K.; Thackray, Arnold; Zuckerman, Harriet, eds. (1978). Toward a Metric of Science: The Advent of Science Indicators. New York: Wiley. ISBN 978-0-471-98435-1.
- Zuckerman, Harriet; Miller, Roberta Balstad, eds. (1980). Science Indicators: Implications for Research and Policy Harriet Zuckerman; Roberta Balstad Miller. Based upon the 1978 May Conference spons. by the Social Science Research Council. Social Science Research Council.
- Pfafflin, S. M.; Zuckerman, Harriet; Cole, Jonathan R. (1991). The Outer Circle: Women in the Scientific Community (1st ed.). New York: Norton. ISBN 978-0-393-02773-0.
- Ehrenberg, Ronald G.; Zuckerman, Harriet; Groen, Jeffrey A.; Brucker, Sharon M. (2010). Educating Scholars: Doctoral Education in the Humanities. Princeton and Oxford: Princeton University Press.
- Harriet Zuckerman papers, 1887-2014, bulk 1963-1992 at the Rare Book and Manuscript Library, Columbia University, New York, NY

== Awards ==
Zuckerman is a Fellow of both the American Association for the Advancement of Science (1979) and the American Academy of Arts and Sciences (1985) and a Guggenheim Fellow (1981–1982), among others. She is also a member of the American Philosophical Society.

== See also ==
- Historic recurrence
- List of multiple discoveries
