= Matthew effect =

The rich get richer and the poor get poorer

Matthew 25:29 in the King James Version of the Christian Bible

The Matthew effect, sometimes called the Matthew principle or cumulative advantage, is the tendency of individuals to accrue social or economic success in proportion to their initial level of popularity, friends, wealth, and natural advantages. It is sometimes summarized by the adage or platitude "the rich get richer and the poor get poorer". Also termed the "Matthew effect of accumulated advantage", taking its name from the Parable of the Talents in the Christian-biblical Gospel of Matthew, it was coined by sociologists Robert K. Merton and Harriet Zuckerman in 1968.

Early studies of the Matthew effect focused primarily on inequality in how scientists were recognized for their work. However, Norman W. Storer of Columbia University led a new wave of research. He believed he had discovered that the inequality in the social sciences also existed in other institutions. Later, in network science, researchers discovered a form of the Matthew effect in internet networks, terming it "preferential attachment". Researchers later reapplied the mathematics used for this network analysis to the Matthew effect more generally, where wealth or credit is distributed among individuals according to how much they already have. This has the net effect of making it increasingly difficult for low-ranked individuals to increase their totals because they have fewer resources to risk over time, and increasingly easy for high-ranked individuals to preserve a large total because they have more to risk.

== Etymology ==
The concept is named after two parables of Jesus in the Synoptic Gospels (Table 2 of the Eusebian Canons). The concept concludes both synoptic versions of the parable of the talents:

For to every one who has will more be given, and he will have abundance; but from him who has not, even what he has will be taken away.

— Gospel of Matthew 25:29, Revised Standard Version (RSV).

I tell you, that to every one who has will more be given; but from him who has not, even what he has will be taken away.

— Gospel of Luke 19:26, RSV.

The concept concludes two of the three synoptic versions of the parable of the lamp under a bushel (which is absent in the version by the Matthean author):

For to him who has will more be given; and from him who has not, even what he has will be taken away.

— Gospel of Mark 4:25, RSV.

Take heed then how you hear; for to him who has will more be given, and from him who has not, even what he thinks that he has will be taken away.

— Gospel of Luke 8:18, RSV.

The concept is presented again in Matthew outside of a parable during Jesus's explanation to his disciples of the purpose of parables:

And he answered them, "To you it has been given to know the secrets of the Kingdom of Heaven, but to them it has not been given. For to him who has will more be given, and he will have abundance; but from him who has not, even what he has will be taken away."

— Gospel of Matthew 13:11–12, RSV.

== Sociology of science ==
=== Cumulative advantage ===
In the sociology of science, the first description of the Matthew effect was given by Derek J. de Solla Price in 1976. (He referred to the process as a "cumulative advantage" process.) His work was also the first application of the process to network growth, producing what is now called a scale-free network. It is in the context of network growth that the process is most frequently studied today. Price also promoted preferential attachment as a possible explanation for power laws in many other phenomena, including Lotka's law of scientific productivity and Bradford's law of journal use.

=== Coining the "Matthew effect" ===
"Matthew effect" was a term coined by Robert K. Merton and Harriet Anne Zuckerman to describe how, among other things, eminent scientists will often get more credit than a comparatively unknown researcher, even if their work is similar; it also means that credit will usually be given to researchers who are already famous. For example, a prize will almost always be awarded to the most senior researcher involved in a project, even if all the work was done by a graduate student. This was later formulated by Stephen Stigler as Stigler's law of eponymy—"No scientific discovery is named after its original discoverer"—with Stigler explicitly naming Merton as the true discoverer, making his 'law' an example of itself. Merton and Zuckerman further argued that in the scientific community the Matthew effect extends beyond reputation to influence the wider communication system, shaping social selection processes and concentrating resources and talent. They gave the example of the disproportionate visibility given to articles from acknowledged authors, at the expense of equally valid or superior articles written by unknown authors. They also noted that concentrating attention on eminent individuals can increase their self-assurance, pushing them to pursue research in important but risky problem areas.

The Matthew effect also relates to broader patterns of scientific productivity, which additional sociological concepts in science can explain, such as the sacred spark, cumulative advantage, and search costs minimization by journal editors. The sacred spark paradigm suggests that scientists differ in initial abilities, talent, skills, persistence, work habits, etc., which give some individuals an early advantage. These factors have a multiplicative effect, which helps these scholars succeed later. The cumulative advantage model argues that initial success helps a researcher gain access to resources (e.g., teaching release, top graduate students, funding, facilities, etc.), which in turn leads to further success. Search-cost minimization by journal editors occurs when editors try to save time and effort by consciously or subconsciously selecting articles from well-known scholars. Although the exact mechanism underlying these phenomena remains unknown, research shows that a minority of academics produce most research output and attract most citations.

Beyond its influence on recognition and productivity, the Matthew effect also appears in the distribution of scientific resources, such as funding. A large Matthew effect was found in a study of science funding in the Netherlands, where winners just above the funding threshold accumulated more than twice as much funding over the next eight years as non-winners with near-identical review scores just below the threshold.

== Education ==
In education, the term "Matthew effect" has been adopted by psychologist Keith Stanovich and popularised by education theorist Anthony Kelly to describe a phenomenon observed in research on how new readers acquire the skills to read. Effectively, early success in acquiring reading skills usually leads to later successes in reading as the learner grows, while failing to learn to read before the third or fourth year of schooling may be indicative of lifelong problems in learning new skills.

This is because children who fall behind in reading would read less, increasing the gap between them and their peers. Later, when students need to "read to learn" (where before they were learning to read), their reading difficulty creates difficulty in most other subjects. In this way they fall further and further behind in school, dropping out at a much higher rate than their peers. This effect has been used in legal cases, such as Brody v. Dare County Board of Education. Such cases argue that early education intervention is essential for disabled children, and that failing to do so negatively impacts those children.

A 2014 review of Matthew effect in education found mixed empirical evidence, where Matthew effect tends to describe the development of primary school skills, while a compensatory pattern was found for skills with ceiling effects. A 2016 study on reading comprehension assessments for over 99,000 students found a pattern of stable differences, with some narrowing of the gap for students with learning disabilities.

== Network science ==
In network science, the Matthew effect was noticed as preferential attachment of earlier nodes in a network, which explains that these nodes tend to attract more links early on.

The application of preferential attachment to the growth of the World Wide Web was proposed by Barabási and Albert in 1999. Barabási and Albert also coined the name "preferential attachment", and suggested that the process might apply to the growth of other networks as well. For growing networks, the precise functional form of preferential attachment can be estimated by maximum likelihood estimation.

Due to preferential attachment, Matjaž Perc writes "a node that acquires more connections than another one will increase its connectivity at a higher rate, and thus an initial difference in the connectivity between two nodes will increase further as the network grows, while the degree of individual nodes will grow proportional with the square root of time." The Matthew Effect therefore explains the growth of some nodes in vast networks such as the Internet.

== Cosmology ==
The gravitational instability of vast amounts of hydrogen gas in the cosmos causes clumping around local areas of higher density, leading to star formation and the clustering of stars into galaxies. The concentration of mass into stars reduces the concentration in surrounding areas. The overall process is referred to as the "Matthew effect".

== Career progression ==
A model for career progress quantitatively incorporates the Matthew Effect in order to predict the distribution of individual career length in competitive professions. The model predictions are validated by analyzing the empirical distributions of career length for careers in science and professional sports (e.g. Major League Baseball). As a result, the disparity between the large number of short careers and the relatively small number of extremely long careers can be explained by the "rich-get-richer" mechanism, which in this framework, provides more experienced and more reputable individuals with a competitive advantage in obtaining new career opportunities.

Bask (2024) reviewed theoretical research on academic career progression and found that Feichtinger et al. developed a model where a researcher's reputation grows through scientific effort but declines without continual activity Their model incorporates the Matthew effect, in that researchers with high initial reputations benefit more from their efforts, while those with low reputations may see theirs diminish even with similar effort. They showed that if a researcher starts with low reputation, their career is likely to decline and eventually end, whereas researchers starting with high reputation may either sustain a successful career or face early exit depending on their effort over time.

== Markets with social influence ==
Experiments manipulating download counts or bestseller lists for books and music have shown consumer activity follows the apparent popularity.

Social influence often induces a rich-get-richer phenomenon where popular products tend to become even more popular. An example of the Matthew Effect's role on social influence is an experiment by Salganik, Dodds, and Watts in which they created an experimental virtual market named MUSICLAB. In MUSICLAB, people could listen to music and choose to download the songs they enjoyed the most. The song choices were unknown songs produced by unknown bands. There were two groups tested; one group was given zero additional information on the songs and one group was told the popularity of each song and the number of times it had previously been downloaded. As a result, the group that saw which songs were the most popular and were downloaded the most were then biased to choose those songs as well. The songs that were most popular and downloaded the most stayed at the top of the list and consistently received the most plays. To summarize the experiment's findings, the performance rankings had the largest effect boosting expected downloads the most. Download rankings had a decent effect; however, not as impactful as the performance rankings. Abeliuk et al. (2015) also proved that when utilizing "performance rankings", a monopoly will be created for the most popular songs.

== Cumulative inequality theory ==
Kenneth Ferraro and colleagues developed the ideas behind this theory as an integrative or middle-range theory. Originally specified in five axioms and nineteen propositions, cumulative inequality theory incorporates elements from the following theories and perspectives, several of which are related to the study of society:

- Robert K. Merton articulated the Matthew effect to explain accumulating advantage
- Glen Elder's life-course perspective
- Stress process theory
- Age stratification theory

Ferraro & Shippee (2009) further developed this framework, asserting that "social systems generate inequality, which is manifested over the life course via demographic and developmental processes."

McDonough et al. (2015) studied cumulative disadvantage in generational health inequality among mothers in Britain and the United States. The study examined whether "adverse circumstances early in the life course cumulate as health-harming biographical patterns across working and family caregiving years." Also, it was examined whether institutional context moderated the cumulative effects of micro-level processes. The results showed that existing health disparities of women in midlife, during work and family rearing time, were intensified by cumulative disadvantages caused by adversities in early life.

MacLean (2010) studied U.S. combat and non-combat veterans through the lens of cumulative disadvantage. He found that negative outcomes caused by disability and unemployment were more likely to influence the lives of combat veterans, who often suffered physical and emotional trauma that impeded their ability to obtain employment.

Wooldredge et al. (2015) studied prison sentencing across racial groups, specifically focusing on African American males with prior felony convictions. They examined how pre-trial processes affect trial outcomes and found cumulative disadvantage for African American males and young men. They observed effects in bond amounts, pre-trial detention, and the likelihood of prison sentences; however, they found no significant effect on charge reductions or sentence length.

Ferraro & Kelley-Moore (2003) applied the theory to the long-term consequences of early obesity on midlife health and socioeconomic attainment. The study shows that obesity experienced in early life leads to lower-body disability and increased health risk factors. The research also connects early-life obesity to social stigma and found that it negatively impacts labor market positioning and wages.

Crystal, Shea & Reyes (2016) used the Gini coefficient to analyze how cumulative advantage influenced economic inequality within age cohorts between 1980 and 2010. The study found that inequality was highest among individuals aged 65 and older, with significant increases observed during economic recessions, times of war, and among the baby boomer generation. The researchers utilized these patterns to estimate how potential changes to Social Security might impact older adults in the United States.

Cumulative inequality and cumulative disadvantage theories provide a framework for examining how social and demographic factors intersect over time to influence public policy and individuals' roles in society.

== Life course inequality ==
The concept of cumulative advantage, based on Merton and Zuckerman's Matthew Effect, has been widely applied to the study of life course inequality. Dannefer (2003) argued that inequalities in resources, health, and social status systematically widen over time, shaped by social institutions, economic structures, and psychosocial factors like perceived agency and self-efficacy. Early advantages or disadvantages become amplified, producing growing disparities as individuals age. Pallas & Jennings (2009) further highlighted how cumulative advantage involves shifts between different types of capital, such as human, economic, and symbolic, complicating efforts to measure inequality over time.

Research has expanded cumulative advantage beyond aging to domains such as education, work, health, and wealth. In education, early academic differences lead to greater access to opportunities and resources, compounding over time. In the workforce, initial job placements and early career achievements create divergent paths in earnings and occupational mobility. Family background and neighborhood contexts also play a role, reinforcing early disparities across the life course.

== Mitigation ==
Open Science is "the movement to make scientific research (including publications, data, physical samples, and software) and its dissemination accessible to all levels of society, amateur or professional". One of its key motivations is increasing equity in scientific endeavors. However, Ross-Hellauer, T. et al. (2022) argue that Open Science's ambition to reduce inequalities in academia may inadvertently perpetuate or exacerbate existing disparities caused by cumulative advantage. As Open Science progresses, it faces the challenge of balancing its goals of openness and accessibility with the risk that its practices could reinforce the privileges of the more advantaged, particularly in terms of access to knowledge, technology, and funding. The authors make this critique to urge professionals to reflect "upon the ways in which implementation may run counter to ideals".

== See also ==
- Ability grouping
- Anchoring effect
- Attention inequality
- Boots theory
- Capital accumulation
- Convergence
- Google Scholar effect
- The internal contradictions of capital accumulation
- Lindy effect
- Matilda effect
- Metcalfe's law
- Network effect
- Pareto distribution
- Positive feedback
- Preferential attachment
- Quotation § Misquotations
- Snowball effect
- Social network analysis
- Tracking (education)
- Virtuous circle and vicious circle
- Wealth concentration
