= Ginestra Bianconi =

Italian British network scientist and mathematical physicist

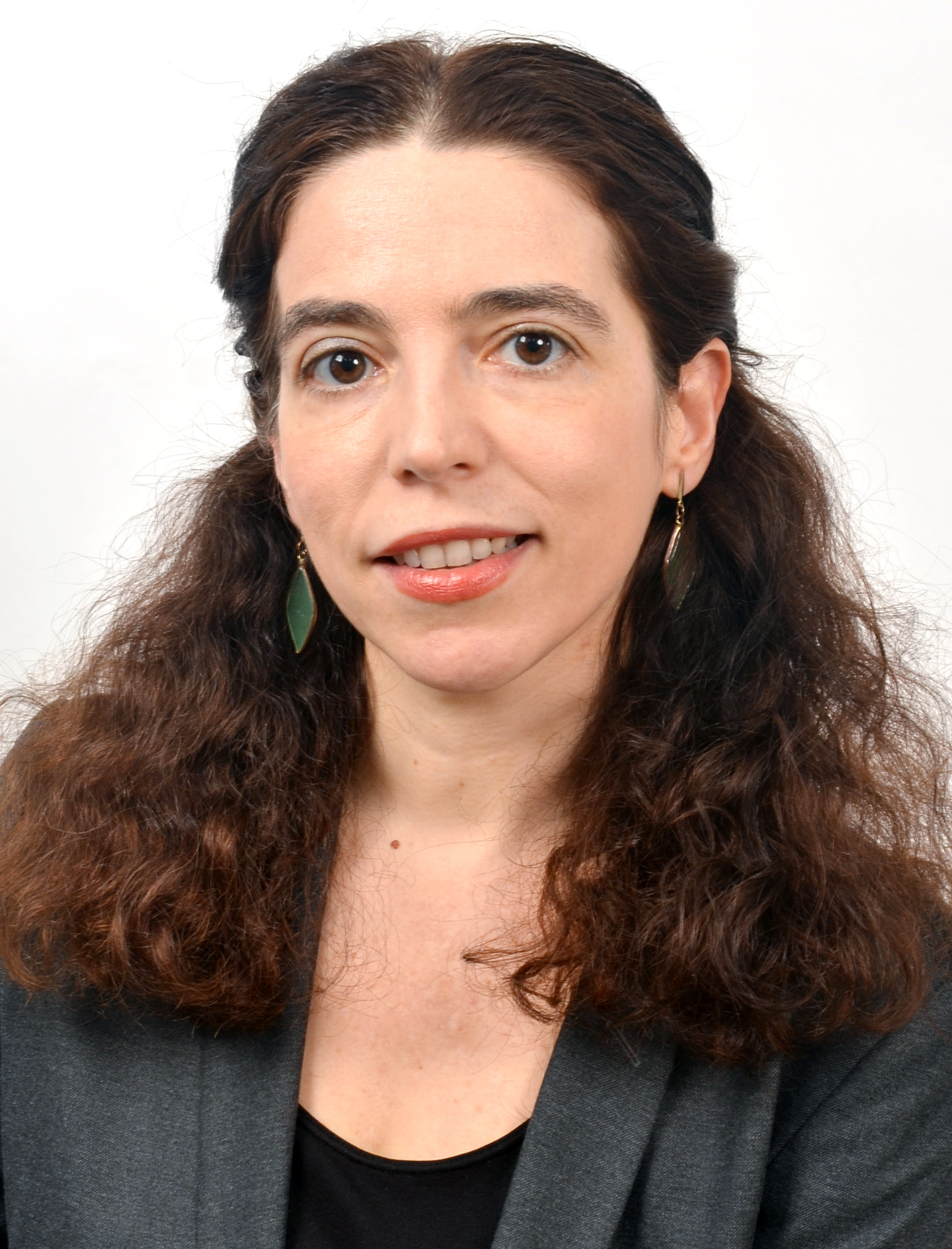
- Citizenship: Italian, British
- Education: Sapienza University of Rome (laurea); University of Notre Dame (Ph.D)
- Known for: Bianconi–Barabási model
- Awards: Euler Award; APS Fellow; Fellows of the Network Science Society
- Scientific career
- Fields: Network science; Mathematical physics; Statistical mechanics
- Workplaces: Northeastern University; Queen Mary University of London; Alan Turing Institute
- Doctoral advisor: Albert-László Barabási

Ginestra Bianconi is a network scientist and mathematical physicist, known for her work on statistical mechanics, network theory, multilayer and higher-order networks, and in particular for the Bianconi–Barabási model of growing of complex networks and for the Bose–Einstein condensation (network theory) in complex networks. She is a professor of applied mathematics at Queen Mary University of London, and the editor-in-chief of Journal of Physics: Complexity.

== Education and career ==
Bianconi earned an undergraduate degree in physics from Sapienza University of Rome in 1998, advised by Luciano Pietronero, and a PhD from the University of Notre Dame in 2002, advised by Albert-László Barabási.

After postdoctoral research at the University of Fribourg in Switzerland and the International Centre for Theoretical Physics in Italy, she became an assistant professor at Northeastern University in 2009. She moved to Queen Mary University of London in 2013, and became professor there in 2019. From 2018 to 2024 she worked at the Alan Turing Institute as Alan Turing Fellow.

As of 2025, Ginestra Bianconi holds Italian and British citizenship.

== Book ==
Bianconi is author of the books Multilayer Networks: Structure and Function (Oxford University Press, 2018) and Higher-Order Networks: An introduction to Simplicial Complexes (Cambridge University Press, 2021). She also co-edited the book Networks of Networks in Biology (Cambridge University Press, 2021).

== Honours ==
Bianconi was named as a Network Society Fellow in 2020. She is member of the European Academy of Sciences. She was named a Fellow of the American Physical Society in 2023, "for seminal contributions to the statistical mechanics of simple, multilayer, and higher-order networks, and for revealing the interplay between network structure and dynamics in the Bose-Einstein condensation in complex networks". She is the winner of the 2025 Euler Award of the Network Science Society "for pioneering contributions to the theory of generalized networks, encompassing both the structural and dynamical aspects of multiplex and higher-order systems."
