= Preferential attachment =

Stochastic process formalizing cumulative advantage

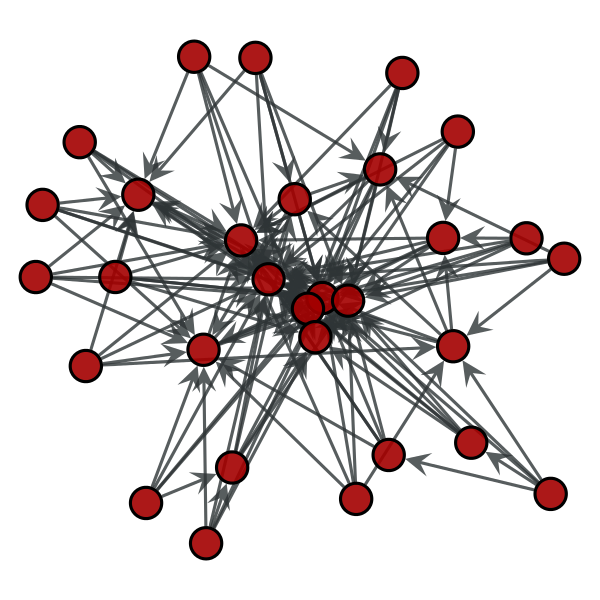
Graph generated using preferential attachment. A small number of nodes have a large number of incoming edges, whereas a large number of nodes have a small number of incoming edges.

A preferential attachment process is any of a class of processes in which some quantity, typically some form of wealth or credit, is distributed among a number of individuals or objects according to how much they already have, so that those who are already wealthy receive more than those who are not.

"Preferential attachment" is only the most recent of many names that have been given to such processes. They are also referred to under the names Yule process, cumulative advantage, the rich get richer, and the Matthew effect. They are also related to Gibrat's law.

The principal reason for scientific interest in preferential attachment is that it can, under suitable circumstances, generate power law distributions. If preferential attachment is non-linear, measured distributions may deviate from a power law. These mechanisms may generate distributions which are approximately power law over transient periods.

== Definition ==
A preferential attachment process is a stochastic urn process, meaning a process in which discrete units of wealth, usually called "balls", are added in a random or partly random fashion to a set of objects or containers, usually called "urns". A preferential attachment process is an urn process in which additional balls are added continuously to the system and are distributed among the urns as an increasing function of the number of balls the urns already have. In the most commonly studied examples, the number of urns also increases continuously, although this is not a necessary condition for preferential attachment and examples have been studied with constant or even decreasing numbers of urns.

A classic example of a preferential attachment process is the growth in the number of species per genus in some higher taxon of biotic organisms. New genera ("urns") are added to a taxon whenever a newly appearing species is considered sufficiently different from its predecessors that it does not belong in any of the current genera. New species ("balls") are added as old ones speciate (i.e., split in two) and, assuming that new species belong to the same genus as their parent (except for those that start new genera), the probability that a new species is added to a genus will be proportional to the number of species the genus already has. This process, first studied by British statistician Udny Yule, is a linear preferential attachment process, since the rate at which genera accrue new species is linear in the number they already have.

Linear preferential attachment processes in which the number of urns increases are known to produce a distribution of balls over the urns following the so-called Yule distribution. In the most general form of the process, balls are added to the system at an overall rate of m new balls for each new urn. Each newly created urn starts out with k_{0} balls and further balls are added to urns at a rate proportional to the number k that they already have plus a constant a > −k_{0}. With these definitions, the fraction P(k) of urns having k balls in the limit of long time is given by

$$P(k)={\mathrm{B}(k+a,\gamma)\over\mathrm{B}(k_0+a,\gamma-1)},$$

for k ≥ k_{0} (and zero otherwise), where B(x, y) is the Euler beta function:

$$\mathrm{B}(x,y)={\Gamma(x)\Gamma(y)\over\Gamma(x+y)},$$

with Γ(x) being the standard gamma function, and

$$\gamma=2 + {k_0 + a\over m}.$$

The beta function behaves asymptotically as B(x, y) ~ x^{−y} for large x and fixed y, which implies that for large values of k we have

$$P(k) \propto k^{-\gamma}.$$

In other words, the preferential attachment process generates a "long-tailed" distribution following a Pareto distribution or power law in its tail. This is the primary reason for the historical interest in preferential attachment: the species distribution and many other phenomena are observed empirically to follow power laws and the preferential attachment process is a leading candidate mechanism to explain this behavior. Preferential attachment is considered a possible candidate for, among other things, the distribution of the sizes of cities, the wealth of extremely wealthy individuals, the number of citations received by learned publications, and the number of links to pages on the World Wide Web.

The general model described here includes many other specific models as special cases. In the species/genus example above, for instance, each genus starts out with a single species (k_{0} = 1) and gains new species in direct proportion to the number it already has (a = 0), and hence P(k) = B(k, γ)/B(k_{0}, γ − 1) with γ=2 + 1/m. Similarly the Price model for scientific citations corresponds to the case k_{0} = 0, a = 1 and the widely studied Barabási-Albert model corresponds to k_{0} = m, a = 0.

Preferential attachment is sometimes referred to as the Matthew effect, but the two are not precisely equivalent. The Matthew effect, first discussed by Robert K. Merton, is named for a passage in the biblical Gospel of Matthew: "For everyone who has will be given more, and he will have an abundance. Whoever does not have, even what he has will be taken from him." (Matthew 25:29, New International Version.) The preferential attachment process does not incorporate the taking away part. This point may be moot, however, since the scientific insight behind the Matthew effect is in any case entirely different. Qualitatively it is intended to describe not a mechanical multiplicative effect like preferential attachment but a specific human behavior in which people are more likely to give credit to the famous than to the little known. The classic example of the Matthew effect is a scientific discovery made simultaneously by two different people, one well known and the other little known. It is claimed that under these circumstances people tend more often to credit the discovery to the well-known scientist. Thus the real-world phenomenon the Matthew effect is intended to describe is quite distinct from (though certainly related to) preferential attachment.

== History ==
The first rigorous consideration of preferential attachment seems to be that of Udny Yule in 1925, who used it to explain the power-law distribution of the number of species per genus of flowering plants. The process is sometimes called a "Yule process" in his honor. Yule was able to show that the process gave rise to a distribution with a power-law tail, but the details of his proof are, by today's standards, contorted and difficult, since the modern tools of stochastic process theory did not yet exist and he was forced to use more cumbersome methods of proof.

Most modern treatments of preferential attachment make use of the master equation method, whose use in this context was pioneered by Simon in 1955, in work on the distribution of sizes of cities and other phenomena.

The first application of preferential attachment to learned citations was given by Price in 1976. (He referred to the process as a "cumulative advantage" process.) His was also the first application of the process to the growth of a network, producing what would now be called a scale-free network. It is in the context of network growth that the process is most frequently studied today. Price also promoted preferential attachment as a possible explanation for power laws in many other phenomena, including Lotka's law of scientific productivity and Bradford's law of journal use.

The application of preferential attachment to the growth of the World Wide Web was proposed by Barabási and Albert in 1999. Barabási and Albert also coined the name "preferential attachment" by which the process is best known today and suggested that the process might apply to the growth of other networks as well. For growing networks, the precise functional form of preferential attachment can be estimated by maximum likelihood estimation.

== See also ==
- Assortative mixing
- Bose–Einstein condensation: a network theory approach
- Capital accumulation
- Chinese restaurant process
- Complex network
- Double jeopardy (marketing)
- Lindy effect
- Link-centric preferential attachment
- Pitman–Yor process
- Price's model
- Proof of stake
- Simon model
- Success to the successful
- Wealth condensation
- Yule–Simon distribution
- Bibliogram
