= Vigilance (behavioural ecology) =

Vigilance, in the field of behavioural ecology, refers to an animal's monitoring of its surroundings in order to heighten awareness of predator presence. Vigilance is an important behaviour during foraging as animals must often venture away from the safety of shelter to find food. However, being vigilant comes at the expense of time spent feeding, so there is a trade-off between the two. The length of time animals devote to vigilance is dependent on many factors including predation risk and hunger.

Vigilance is often observed in animals that forage in groups, such as yellow-eyed juncos (Junco phaeonutus) and meerkats (Suricata suricatta). Foraging in groups dilutes an individual's risk of predation, and allows them to reduce their own vigilance while the vigilance of the group is maintained. Alarm signals may be used to alert the group to the presence of predators. Groups of some species have at least one individual on sentry duty who looks out for predators on a perch while the rest of the group forages.

== Feeding and predation risk trade-off ==
Vigilance and feeding (both searching for and handling food) are generally mutually exclusive activities, leading to foragers facing a trade-off between energy intake and safety from predation. As time allocated to scanning reduces the time spent feeding, vigilant individuals must devote more time to foraging to obtain the required food intake. This impedes other activities, such as mating, and prolongs their exposure to predation as foraging occurs away from shelter. When foraging time is limited, vigilant animals are left with a reduced energy intake.

Optimality models can be used to predict foraging decisions of an animal based on costs (predation risk, starvation) and benefits (safety, food), which are also affected by physiology such as hunger levels.

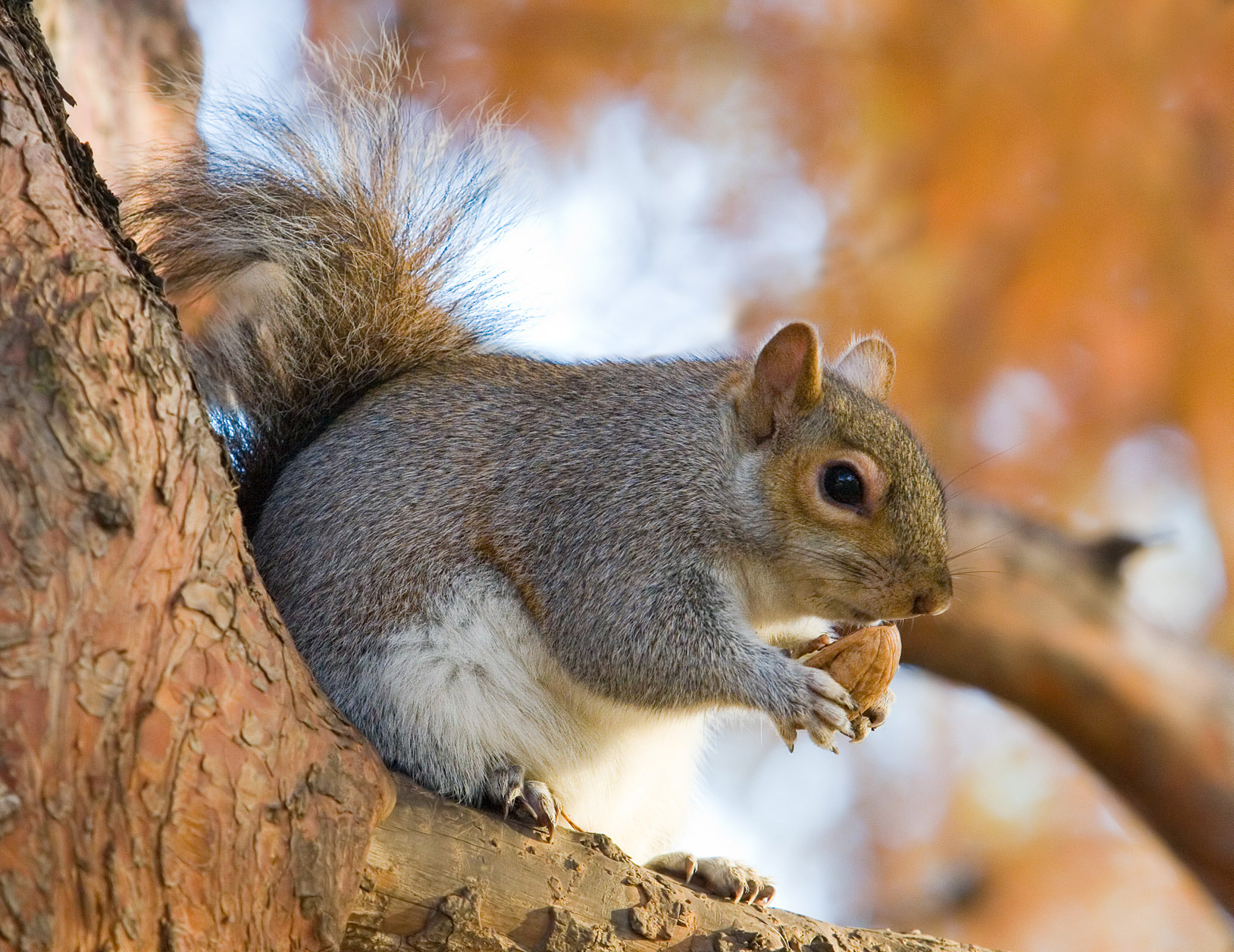
A grey squirrel (Sciurus carolinensis) feeding in the safety of a tree to minimise exposure to predators during food handling

Grey squirrels (Sciurus carolinensis) alter their behaviour according to the relative costs and benefits when foraging in the open. Small food items are consumed immediately to maximise energy intake, as they require little handling time so the predation risk is low. Large items that require a long handling time, and hence time exposed to predators, are carried back to the safety of a tree to minimise predation risk. Although there is an energetic cost to transporting food, large food items have a high contribution to nutrient intake, so the benefits outweigh the cost.

The overall predation risk is a function of the abundance, activity and ability of predators to detect the forager, as well as the likelihood that the forager can escape the predator if it is not vigilant. Animals prioritise vigilance over feeding when the predation risk is high. For example, yellow-eyed juncos spend more time scanning for predators when a potential predator, a Harris's hawk (Parabuteo unicinctus), is present compared to when the hawk is absent.

Another factor that influences vigilance is the benefit that is expected from foraging in the absence of predation. This is dependent on the quality of the food as well as the energetic state of the individual. If there is much to be gained from feeding, foragers may forgo vigilance. Similarly, if hungry animals have a higher chance of dying from starvation than from predation, it is more beneficial to sacrifice vigilance to fulfill their energy requirements. When three-spined sticklebacks (Gasterosteus aculeatus) are deprived of food, they prefer to feed in locations with a high density of water fleas. The cost to this choice is that the sticklebacks must concentrate on picking out the prey due to the 'predator confusion effect' where many moving targets make it difficult for predators to pick out individual prey. This choice means that the sticklebacks are less able to scan for predators; however, the risk of starvation is relatively higher than the risk of predation. Similarly, juncos that have been deprived of food exhibit lower levels of vigilance, instead focusing on rapid feeding, which is a behaviour incompatible with scanning.

=== Habitat and food choice ===
The state of an animal can change due to its behaviour and vice versa due to the dynamic feedback between foraging, body reserves and predation risk. The feedback can influence an individual's choice of where, when and what to feed on. If the predation risk is so great that an animal must maintain a level of vigilance that drastically inhibits feeding, it may opt for an alternative.

For example, the bluegill sunfish (Lepomis macrochirus) has the choice of foraging on plankton in the safety of reeds or on benthic invertebrates which are a better quality food source. When a predator (the largemouth bass) is present, smaller sunfish spend the majority of their time foraging in the reeds despite this choice reducing their food intake and seasonal growth rate. Sunfish that are too large to be eaten by the bass forage almost entirely on benthos. Although staying in the reeds results in a slower growth rate and a longer period of being a size vulnerable to predators, for maximum survival sunfish choose to remain in the reeds feeding on plankton until they reach a certain size and then leave to feed on benthos.

Nocturnal animals alter the timing of their foraging based on the level of light – avoiding feeding when the moonlight is bright as this is when predation risk is highest.

A raised head is the most common indicator of vigilance, as many animals require their heads to be lowered to search for and handle food. Different foods require different handling that can affect the amount of vigilance an animal can maintain. Seeds without husks, for example, require little handling by birds so are rapidly pecked up with the bird's head down, which is incompatible with vigilance. In situations of high predation risk, animals may choose foods that can be foraged while maintaining vigilance. When dark-eyed juncos (Junco hymenalis) feed in small flocks, they prefer to feed on larger pieces of food than when they are part of a larger flock. As individuals in smaller flocks have a greater need to be vigilant (see more in Vigilance in groups), large pieces of food are more beneficial as they require a longer handling time that can be simultaneously spent scanning, whereas birds feeding on small pieces must intermittently stop foraging to scan their environment.

== Vigilance in groups ==
Both solitary and group foraging come with a variety of costs and benefits, but for many animals, foraging in a group is the most optimal strategy. Among the many benefits of group foraging, reduction of predation risk by improved vigilance is one. Wood pigeons (Columba palumbus) in large flocks are more able to escape predation by goshawks because they are able to spot them and fly away more quickly than they would individually. This is because in larger flocks, it is more likely that one bird will notice the hawk sooner and alert the group by flying away.

=== Group foraging ===
==== Advantages ====
A group of animals may be better at both finding and capturing food than solitary animals. For species that feed on food that is patchy, the likelihood of locating food is greater if individuals search for food independently and inform the rest of the group when a food patch is found. Information sharing in this way has little cost to the individual who locates the food if it occurs in high abundance in the patch.

Group hunting allows predators to take down larger prey, as well as prey that can outrun the predator but can be caught by an ambush. For example, lionesses (Panthera leo) hunt cooperatively for large prey such as zebra (Equus burchelli) and wildebeest (Connochaetes taurinus), with each lioness adopting particular positions in a formation. The presence of many predators also causes panic in groups of prey, often causing them to flee in different directions making it easier for the predators to single out a target.

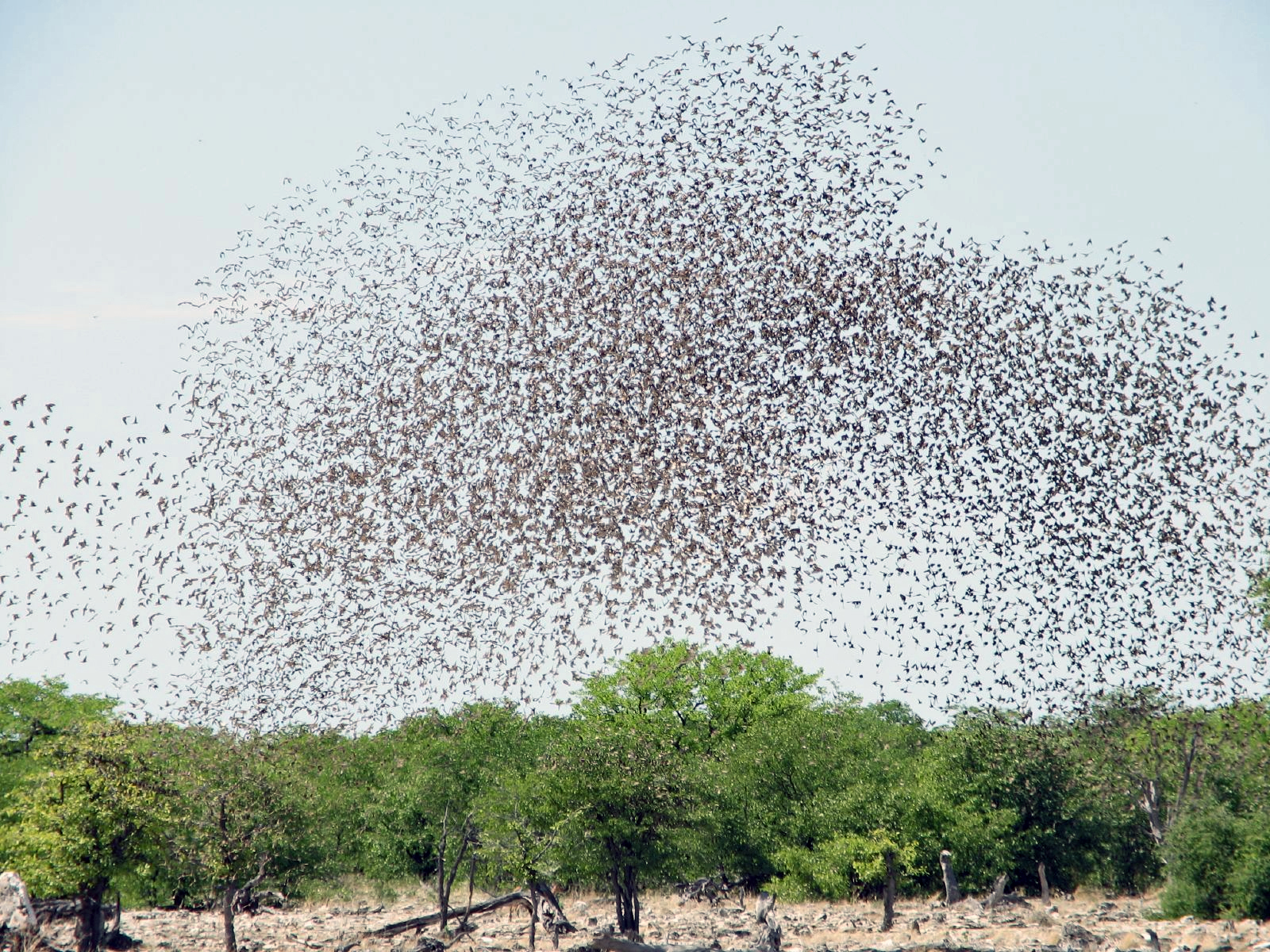
Red-billed queleas form huge flocks of thousands of birds

Foraging in a group also has some anti-predator benefits. Being part of a group dilutes an individual's risk of being attacked, as the more group members there are, the lower the probability that that individual will be the victim. Grouping may swamp the predator's capacity to capture prey - for example, hawks are unable to capture more than one yellow-eyed junco per attack. Large groups also cause predator confusion as it makes it difficult for prey to focus on one target. Groups of animals may engage in communal defences, such as mobbing, for further protection.

==== Disadvantages ====
Dilution of predation risk only occurs if groups of animals are not more prone to attack than individuals. Often large groups are more conspicuous to predators so grouping may increase the risk of attack. Blue acara cichlid fish (Aequidens pulcher) choose shoals of guppies (Poecilia reticulate) to attack based on how visually conspicuous they are, preferring shoals that are larger or exhibit more movement. Foraging in groups requires sharing so may also lead to greater competition for food.

=== Effect of group size ===
Larger groups may have a greater overall vigilance than small groups due to the ‘many eyes’ hypothesis: more eyes scanning for predators means that the proportion of time that at least one individual is vigilant (collective vigilance) is higher. This improved vigilance may allow an individual to decrease the time it allocates to vigilance without any increase in its personal risk of being attacked - particularly as large groups already have a diluted predation risk. Lower individual levels of vigilance with increasing group size has been observed in many bird, mammal and fish species. Individual ostriches (Struthio camelus) and greater rheas (Rhea americana) in large groups both spend less time with their head up than individuals in small groups; however, collective vigilance increases with group size in ostriches but not rheas. Therefore, the many eyes hypothesis does not always hold. Although individuals in groups may be able to decrease the time they spend scanning, and hence reach their energy requirements in a shorter period of time, the increased competition for food in groups may mean that animals need to devote more time overall to foraging due to an increased allocation of time for aggressive behaviour during foraging. For example, the rate of fighting between house sparrows (Passer domesticus) increases with the size of the flock.

=== Alarm signals ===
Large groups of animals are able to detect predators earlier because of the higher probability that at least one individual is being vigilant when the predator approaches. As many predators rely on the element of surprise in successful attacks, early detection of predators reduces predation risk. The detection of a predator by one individual only translates to collective detection if that individual makes some sort of signal to alert the rest of the group. The signal may be a deliberate call made by the vigilant individual (as in the case of meerkats) or simply the departure of the individual who has detected the predator.

Flocks of birds often exhibit collective detection. One or more birds initially detect the threat, and other birds that did not perceive the threat detect their departure and also respond by fleeing. The departure of multiple birds simultaneously is likely to be a more effective alarm signal than that of a single bird as birds regularly depart flocks for reasons other than predator detection.

Water skaters (Halobates robustus) transmit predator avoidance behaviour to the group through the sense of touch: individuals at the edge of the flotilla detect a predator and move, bumping into their neighbours, who in turn start moving and bumping into more individuals. This ‘wave’ of alarm has been termed the ‘Trafalgar Effect’.

==== Sentinels ====
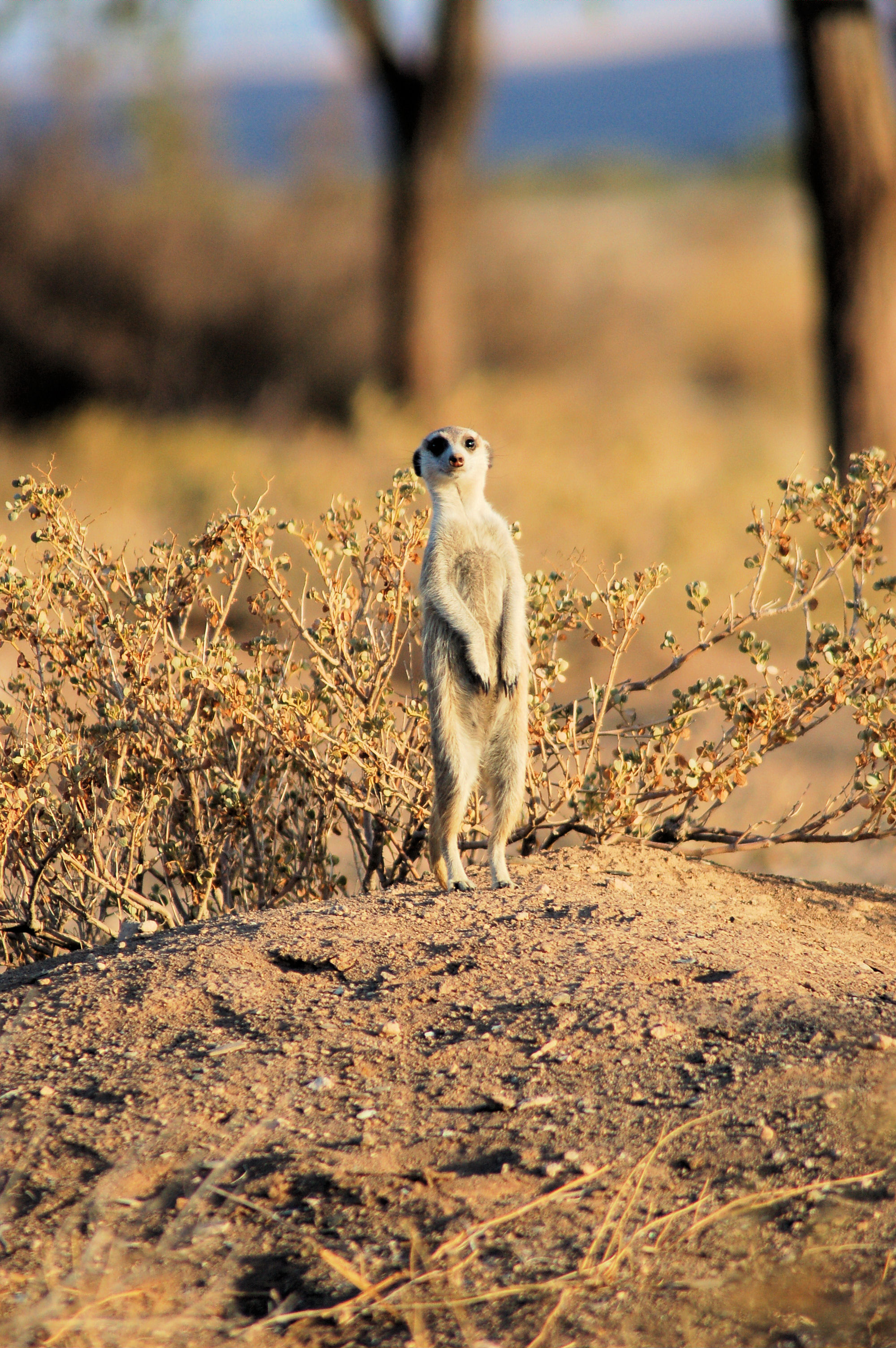
A meerkat (Suricata suricatta) on sentry duty looks out for predators on a perch

In some species, individuals in a foraging group take on sentry duty. The sentinels look out for predators (often from a good vantage point) while the rest of the group forages, and sound an alarm when they spot a predator. Sentry duty is particularly important for species whose foraging activity is incompatible with vigilance, or who feed in areas where they are highly exposed to predators. For example, dwarf mongooses (Helogale parvula) dig up arthropods from the ground to eat; an activity which requires fixation of both their vision and olfaction on the prey.

Often, the sentry makes quiet calls that function as a ‘watchman’s song’ to reassure the rest of the group that an individual is on guard. In response to a vocalising sentry, pied babblers (Turdoides bicolor) decrease their own vigilance, spread out further from the group and forage in more exposed patches resulting in a higher intake of biomass.

Guarding may appear to be an altruistic behaviour as an individual on sentry duty is unable to feed, may be more exposed to predators, and may attract the predators' attention when they make an alarm call. However, meerkats on sentry duty are at no greater risk of predation as they are generally the first to detect predators (e.g. jackals, eagle species) and flee to safety. Meerkats also only go on guard once they are satiated, so if no other individual is on sentry duty, guarding may be the most beneficial behaviour as the individual has no requirement for feeding and can benefit from early predator detection.

=== Cheating ===
In a large group, it is possible for an individual to cheat by scanning less than other members of the group without having any negative effect on the collective vigilance of the group. Cheating would seem to be the most beneficial strategy as the individual still benefits from the collective detection of the group while being able to feed more than other individuals. However, cheating is not a stable strategy because if all members of the group did it, then there would be no collective vigilance. Adopting a very high level of vigilance in a group is also not a stable strategy as an individual who adopts a lower level of vigilance would have a greater advantage. The evolutionarily stable (ESS) scanning rate is the rate that if all group members adopted, an individual that scanned more or less frequently would have a lower chance of survival.

Maintaining individual vigilance may be a more beneficial strategy if vigilant animals gain some sort of advantage. Non-vigilant individuals are often the last to flee to safety, as groups generally flee in succession from the individual who spots the predator, individuals who were vigilant when the first animal departs, and finally the non-vigilant individuals. Predators may also target less vigilant prey as they are likely to detect the predator later and therefore respond more slowly. Cheetahs (Acinonyx jubatus) select less vigilant Thomson's gazelles (Eudorcas thomsonii) before initiating a chase and target them for attack.

== See also ==
- Optimal foraging theory
- Anti-predator adaptation
- Social animal
- Collective animal behaviour
- Elk antipredator behavior
