= Aggregation (ethology) =

Any form of gathering of organisms and the process of coming together

In ethology, an aggregation is any form of gathering of organisms and the process of coming together. In some cases, aggregation occurs in a single species, either to feed or to mate, or merely protection. In a wide variety of taxa, groups of unrelated species might form, in which interaction between members of the aggregation might be minimal; for example herds of grazing zebra and antelopes might combine, both the better to observe the approach of predators, and to improve the odds of escape in the event of attack by predators. Sometimes there might be some interaction, such as mixed flocks of birds that observe each other's foraging behaviour in searching for food.

Sometimes there might be quite orderly common action, such as the queuing up for a resource; for example different species of fishes may aggregate around a cleaning station where cleaner wrasse and cleaner shrimp are active, more or less taking turns for attention. Such aggregations, where there is no particular association of species or sizes, may be referred to loosely as unstructured aggregations. Commonly they are very temporary and may be loose, with flocks or herds associating casually and separating equally casually within hours.

Structured aggregations tend to be longer-term and of a specific life-cycle function and context. Typically, though not necessarily, they will be of a single species. Often they will be of a single age and possibly of a single sex, such as shoals of fish fry that have specific ecological requirements that are not compatible with those of the mature species. One class of such aggregations comprises groups of adult, but immature "bachelor" males of elephants, seals, lions and other animals in which the mature herd will not tolerate males that would begin to compete with the dominant males. Another is when aposematic larvae of certain insects such as some Lepidoptera and Hemiptera form a flock that feed together and may migrate in "processions" until they are mature after which some kinds disperse. Most species of migrating birds and mammals flock on a large scale, partly for protection and partly for greater reliability of navigation. In some species of Hemiptera the adults remain with their aggregated immature offspring, sometimes in protective roles.

The range of functions is very wide in detail, but among the more important classes of function are security against predators, success in food location, wide range of mate choice, with concomitant increase of outbreeding opportunities, location with other members of the same species (sometimes adherence to separate communities can almost amount to parapatric residence when say, different communities of rats or chimpanzees have violent mutual antipathy). There also are various forms of educational function, such as in some species where the young must learn the correct mate recognition skills, and in highly intelligent species such as crows and elephants, must learn the necessary social skills and the necessary traditional foraging techniques in their region.

Aggregation activities are not restricted to the animal kingdom; for one example, a fundamental class of aggregations occurs in the various groups of slime molds, in which separate cells actually aggregate in the process of constructing their reproductive structure.

== See also ==
- Collective animal behavior
- Sociality
