= Collective animal behavior =

Animal cognition

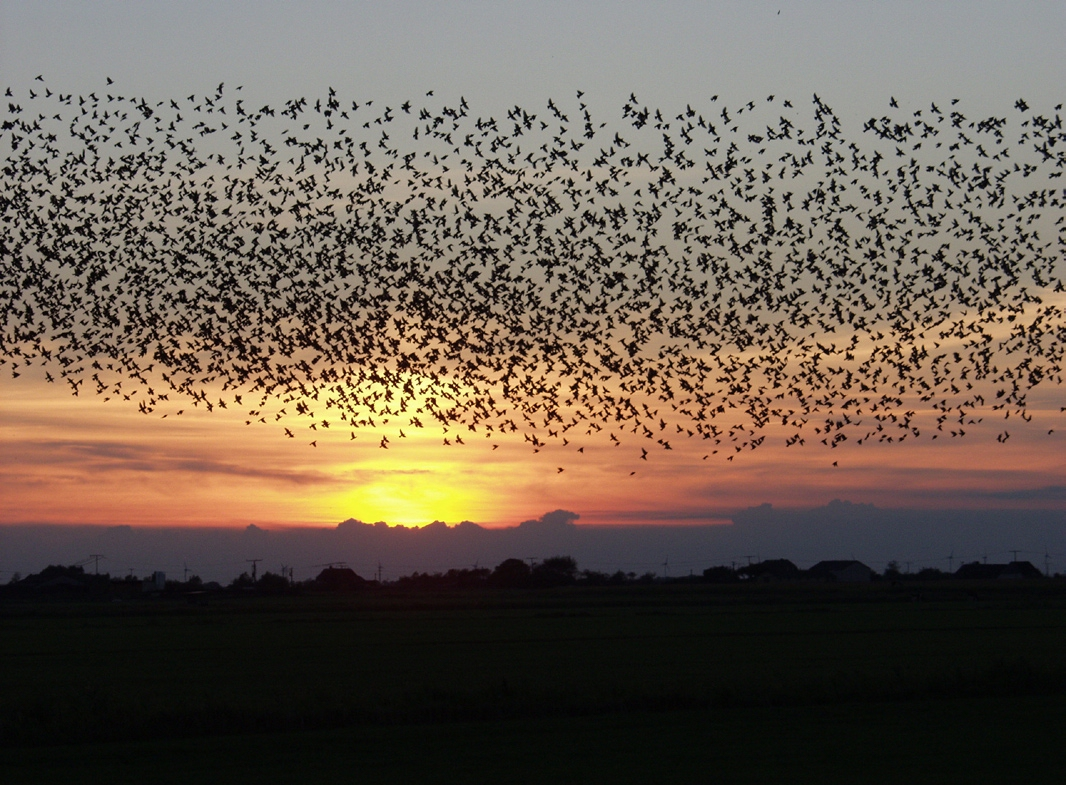
Sort sol. Starling flock at sunset in Denmark

Collective animal behaviour is a form of social behavior involving the coordinated behavior of large groups of similar animals as well as emergent properties of these groups. This can include the costs and benefits of group membership, the transfer of information, decision-making process, locomotion and synchronization of the group. Studying the principles of collective animal behavior has relevance to human engineering problems through the philosophy of biomimetics. For instance, determining the rules by which an individual animal navigates relative to its neighbors in a group can lead to advances in the deployment and control of groups of swimming or flying micro-robots such as UAVs (Unmanned Aerial Vehicles).

== Examples ==
Examples of collective animal behavior include:

- Flocking birds
- Herding ungulates
- Shoaling and schooling fish
- Schooling Antarctic krill
- Pods of dolphins
- Marching locusts
- Nest building ants
- Swarming
- Stampede

== History ==
The basis of collective animal behaviour originated from the study of collective phenomena; that is, repeated interactions among individuals that produce large scale patterns. The foundation of collective phenomena originates from the idea that collective systems can be understood from a set of techniques. For example, Nicolis and Prigogine (1977) employed the use of non-linear thermodynamics to help explain similarities between collective systems at different scales. Other studies aim to use physics, mathematics and chemistry to provide frameworks to study collective phenomena.

== Proposed functions ==
Many functions of animal aggregations have been proposed. These proposed functions may be grouped into the four following categories: social and genetic, anti-predator, enhanced foraging, and increased locomotion efficiency.

=== Social interaction ===
Support for the social and genetic function of aggregations, especially those formed by fish, can be seen in several aspects of their behavior. For instance, experiments have shown that individual fish removed from a school will have a higher respiratory rate than those found in the school. This effect has been partly attributed to stress, although hydrodynamic factors were considered more important in this particular study. The calming effect of being with conspecifics may thus provide a social motivation for remaining in an aggregation. Herring, for instance, will become very agitated if they are isolated from conspecifics. Fish schools have also been proposed to serve a reproductive function since they provide increased access to potential mates. Some scientists have provided disadvantages to mating in aggregations by using robotic male crabs; a female is at a higher risk approaching a cluster, has the ability of comparing males, increasing mate competition.

=== Protection from predators ===
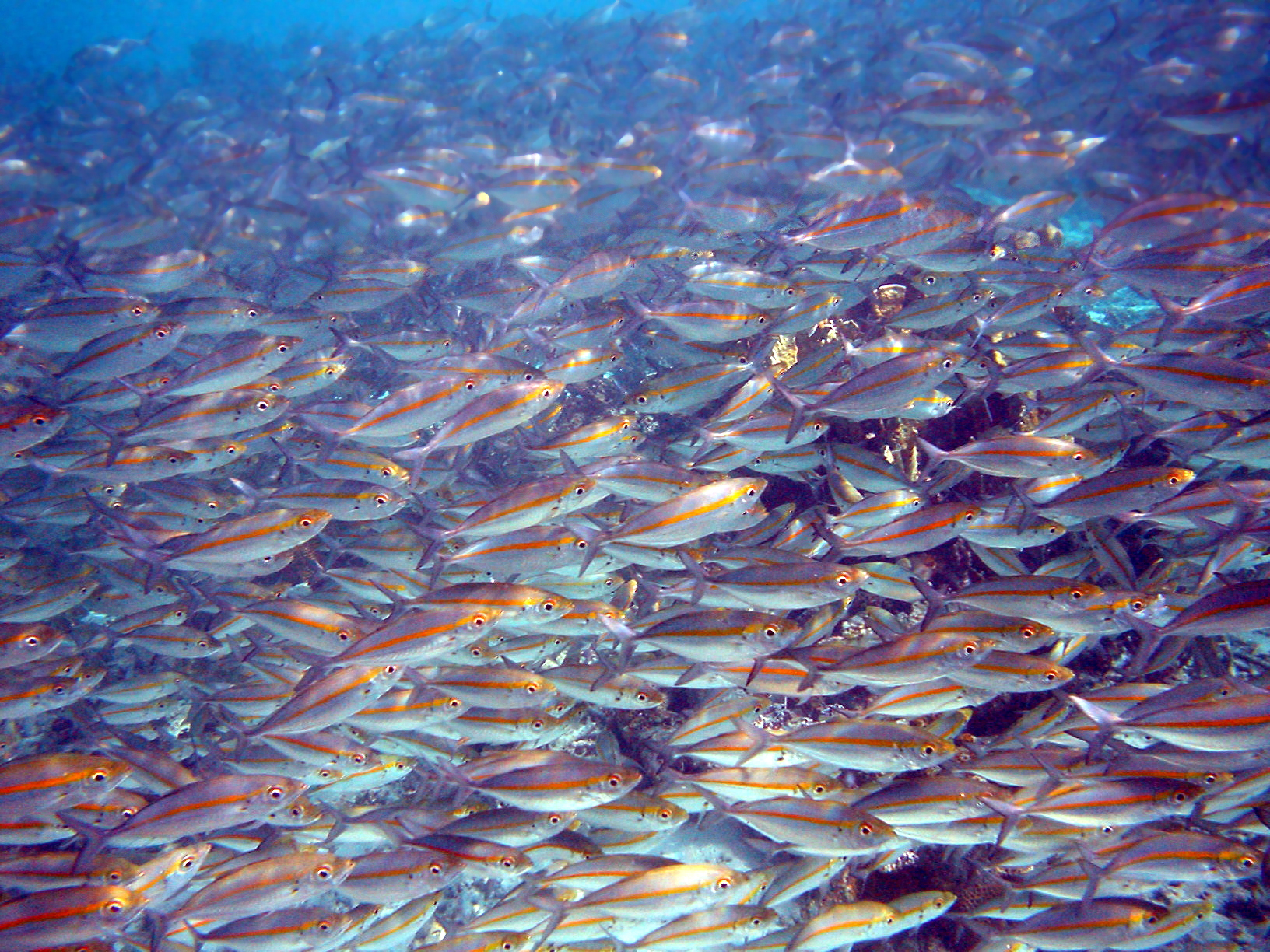
School of goldband fusiliers

Several anti-predator functions of animal aggregations have been proposed. One potential method by which fish schools or bird flocks may thwart predators is the 'predator confusion effect' proposed and demonstrated by Milinski and Heller (1978). This theory is based on the idea that it becomes difficult for predators to pick out individual prey from groups because the many moving targets create a sensory overload of the predator's visual channel. Milinski and Heller's findings have been corroborated both in experiment and computer simulations.

A second potential anti-predator effect of animal aggregations is the "many eyes" hypothesis. This theory states that as the size of the group increases, the task of scanning the environment for predators can be spread out over many individuals. Not only does this mass collaboration presumably provide a higher level of vigilance, it could also allow more time for individual feeding.

A third hypothesis for an anti-predatory effect of animal aggregation is the "encounter dilution" effect. Hamilton, for instance, proposed that the aggregation of animals was due to a "selfish" avoidance of a predator and was thus a form of cover-seeking. Another formulation of the theory was given by Turner and Pitcher and was viewed as a combination of detection and attack probabilities. In the detection component of the theory, it was suggested that potential prey might benefit by living together since a predator is less likely to chance upon a single group than a scattered distribution. In the attack component, it was thought that an attacking predator is less likely to eat a particular animal when a greater number of individuals are present. In sum, an individual has an advantage if it is in the larger of two groups, assuming that the probability of detection and attack does not increase disproportionately with the size of the group.

A fourth theory proposes that "predator-prey survival pressure" could directly drive the evolution of collective behavior, as a result of passive space extrusion and polarization induced by the presence of predators.

=== Enhanced foraging ===
A third proposed benefit of animal groups is that of enhanced foraging. This ability was demonstrated by Pitcher and others in their study of foraging behavior in shoaling cyprinids. In this study, the time it took for groups of minnows and goldfish to find a patch of food was quantified. The number of fishes in the groups was varied, and a statistically significant decrease in the amount of time necessary for larger groups to find food was established. Further support for an enhanced foraging capability of schools is seen in the structure of schools of predatory fish. Partridge and others analyzed the school structure of Atlantic bluefin tuna from aerial photographs and found that the school assumed a parabolic shape, a fact that was suggestive of cooperative hunting in this species (Partridge et al., 1983).

=== Increased locomotion efficiency ===
This theory states that groups of animals moving in a fluid environment may save energy when swimming or flying together, much in the way that bicyclists may draft one another in a peloton. Geese flying in a Vee formation are also thought to save energy by flying in the updraft of the wingtip vortex generated by the previous animal in the formation. Ducklings have also been shown to save energy by swimming in a line. Increased efficiencies in swimming in groups have also been proposed for schools of fish and Antarctic krill.

Another example can be seen in homing pigeons. When a homing pigeon is released with other individuals from its roost, these pigeon groups showed increased efficiency and decision making to shorten the distance of the route taken to return home, thus saving energy when flying between locations.

== Costs of group living ==
=== Ectoparasitism and disease ===
Animals that form colonies form a cost of living in groups. These colonies exhibit a system with close physical proximity and increased contact between individuals, thus increasing transmission of disease and ectoparasites; a universal hazard of animals living in groups.

For example, cliff swallows that are commonly parasitized by swallow bugs incur a cost when forming colonies, as these parasitic bugs increase the mortality rates of cliff swallow nestlings. A study shows that the number of swallow bugs found in cliff swallow nests increased with the increase of cliff swallow colony size, thus reducing overall success of these colonies.

Larger groups of animals tend to harbour an increased number of pathogens and are at a higher risk of epidemics. This is particularly due to the large amount of waste material produced by larger groups, allowing for a favourable environment for pathogens to thrive.

=== Intraspecific competition ===
Another cost to group living is the competition over food resources. As individuals group together, there is an increased nutritional requirement of the larger group compared to smaller groups. This causes an increased energetic cost as individuals now travel farther to visit resource patches.

An example of intraspecific competition can be seen within groups of whales and dolphins. Female bottle-nose dolphins with similar home ranges tend to have varied foraging habits in an effort to reduce and negate the intraspecific competition of resources. Benefits of group living on defence from predators is very evident in nature, however in locations of high resource competition poses an effect on the mortality of certain individuals. This can be seen in species of shoaling fish, where the initial aggregation of individuals to a group initially allowed for the protection from predators, however the limiting resources available changes over time, and mortality rates of these fish begin to increase, showing that resource competition is an important regulator of reef fish groups after the initial benefits of refuge grouping and predatory protection.

Interesting contrasts to the benefit of increased group size on foraging efficiency can be seen in nature particularly due to intraspecific interactions. A study conducted on the Alaskan moose shows that with increasing group size, there is a decrease in foraging efficiency. This is result of increased social aggression in the groups, as the individuals of the group spent most of its time in alert-alarm postures, thus spending less time foraging and feeding, reducing its foraging efficiency.

=== Reproduction and development ===
With increasing colony size and competition of resources within individuals of a group, reproductive rates and development of offspring may vary due to reduced resource availability. For example, a study conducted on groups of leaf monkeys show that infant monkeys in larger group sizes developed slower than those in smaller group sizes. This staggered infant development in the larger groups were closely related to the reduced energetic gain of mothers with reduced available nutrition, thus negatively affecting infant developmental rates. It was also shown that females within the larger groups reproduced more slowly compared to females in smaller groups.

The Eurasian badger (Meles meles) is an example of a species that incur a cost of group living on the successful reproductive rates. Females present in larger groups of badgers have an increased reproductive failure rate compared to solitary badgers. This is a result of increased reproductive competition within the female individuals in the group.

=== Stress ===
Another cost to group living is stress levels within individuals of a group. Stress levels within group living varies dependent on the size of the colony or group. A large group of animals may suffer larger levels of stress arising from intraspecific food competition. In contrast, smaller groups may have increased stress levels arising from the lack of adequate defense from predators as well as a reduced foraging efficiency.

An example can be seen in a study conducted on a species of ring-tail lemurs (Lemur catta). This study found that an optimum group size of around 10-20 individuals produces the lowest level of cortisol (an indicator of stress), while groups with smaller or larger than 10-20 individuals showed an increased level of cortisol production, thus an increased level of stress within the individuals of the larger and smaller groups.

=== Inbreeding ===
Another proposed cost to group living is the cost incurred to avoid inbreeding. Individuals may it be male or females in groups may disperse in an effort to avoid inbreeding. This poses a more detrimental effect on smaller, isolated groups of individuals, as they are at a greater risk of inbreeding and thus suppressing the group's overall fitness.

== Group structure ==
The structure of large animal groups has been difficult to study because of the large number of animals involved. The experimental approach is therefore often complemented by mathematical modeling of animal aggregations.

=== Experimental approach ===
The purpose of experiments investigating the structure of animal aggregations is to determine the 3D position of each animal within a volume at each point in time. It is important to know the internal structure of the group because that structure can be related to the proposed motivations for animal grouping. This capability requires the use of multiple cameras trained on the same volume in space, a technique known as stereophotogrammetry. When hundreds or thousands of animals occupy the study volume, it becomes difficult to identify each individual. In addition, animals may block one another in the camera views, a problem known as occlusion. Once the location of each animal at each point in time is known, various parameters describing the animal group can be extracted.

These parameters include:

Density: The density of an animal aggregation is the number of animals divided by the volume (or area) occupied by the aggregation. Density may not be a constant throughout the group. For instance, starling flocks have been shown to maintain higher densities on the edges than in the middle of the flock, a feature that is presumably related to defense from predators.

Polarity: The group polarity describes if the group animals are all pointing in the same direction or not. In order to determine this parameter, the average orientation of all animals in the group is determined. For each animal, the angular difference between its orientation and the group orientation is then found. The group polarity is then the average of these differences (Viscido 2004).

Nearest Neighbor Distance: The nearest neighbor distance (NND) describes the distance between the centroid of one animal (the focal animal) and the centroid of the animal nearest to the focal animal. This parameter can be found for each animal in an aggregation and then averaged. Care must be taken to account for the animals located at the edge of an animal aggregation. These animals have no neighbor in one direction.

Nearest Neighbor Position: In a polar coordinate system, the nearest neighbor position describes the angle and distance of the nearest neighbor to a focal animal.

Packing Fraction: Packing fraction is a parameter borrowed from physics to define the organization (or state i.e. solid, liquid, or gas) of 3D animal groups. It is an alternative measure to density. In this parameter, the aggregation is idealized as an ensemble of solid spheres, with each animal at the center of a sphere. The packing fraction is defined as the ratio of the total volume occupied by all individual spheres divided by the global volume of the aggregation (Cavagna 2008). Values range from zero to one, where a small packing fraction represents a dilute system like a gas. Cavagna found that the packing fraction for groups of starlings was 0.012.

Integrated Conditional Density: This parameter measures the density at various length scales and therefore describes the homogeneity of density throughout an animal group.

Pair Distribution Function: This parameter is usually used in physics to characterize the degree of spatial order in a system of particles. It also describes the density, but this measures describes the density at a distance away from a given point. Cavagna et al. found that flocks of starlings exhibited more structure than a gas but less than a liquid.

=== Modeling approach ===
The simplest mathematical models of animal aggregations generally instruct the individual animals to follow three rules:

1. Move in the same direction as your neighbor
2. Remain close to your neighbors
3. Avoid collisions with your neighbors

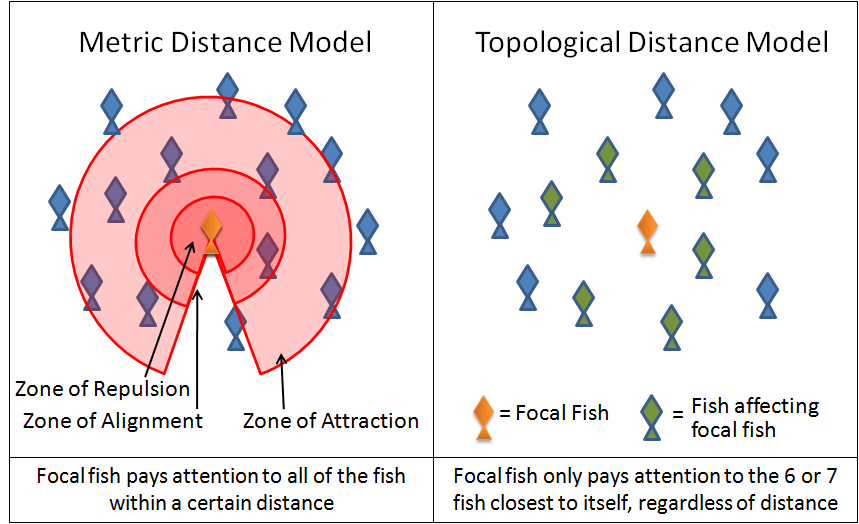
A diagram illustrating the difference between 'metric distance' and 'topological distance' in reference to fish schools

Two examples of this simulation are the Boids program created by Craig Reynolds in 1986 and the Self Propelled Particle model. Many current models use variations on these rules. For instance, many models implement these three rules through layered zones around each animal. In the zone of repulsion very close to the animal, the focal animal will seek to distance itself from its neighbors in order to avoid a collision. In the slightly further away zone of alignment, a focal animal will align its direction of motion with its neighbors. In the outmost zone of attraction, extending the largest distance from the focal animal as it is able to sense, the focal animal will move towards a neighbor. The shape of these zones is affected by the sensory capabilities of the animal. For example, the visual field of a bird does not extend behind its body. Fish, on the other hand, rely on both vision and on hydrodynamic signals relayed through its lateral line. Antarctic krill rely on vision and on hydrodynamic signals relayed through its antennae.

Recent studies of starling flocks have shown, however, that each bird modifies its position relative to the six or seven animals directly surrounding it, no matter how close or how far away those animals are. Interactions between flocking starlings are thus based on a topological rule rather than a metric rule. It remains to be seen whether the same rule can be applied to other animals. Another recent study, based on an analysis of high speed camera footage of flocks above Rome and assuming minimal behavioural rules, has convincingly simulated a number of aspects of flock behaviour.

== Collective decision making ==
Aggregations of animals are faced with decisions which they must make if they are to remain together. For a school of fish, an example of a typical decision might be which direction to swim when confronted by a predator. Social insects such as ants and bees must collectively decide where to build a new nest. A herd of elephants must decide when and where to migrate. How are these decisions made? Do stronger or more experienced 'leaders' exert more influence than other group members, or does the group make a decision by consensus? The answer probably depends on the species. While the role of a leading matriarch in an elephant herd is well known, studies have shown that some animal species use a consensus approach in their collective decision-making process.

A recent investigation showed that small groups of fish used consensus decision-making when deciding which fish model to follow. The fish did this by a simple quorum rule such that individuals watched the decisions of others before making their own decisions. This technique generally resulted in the 'correct' decision but occasionally cascaded into the 'incorrect' decision. In addition, as the group size increased, the fish made more accurate decisions in following the more attractive fish model. Consensus decision-making, a form of collective intelligence, thus effectively uses information from multiple sources to generally reach the correct conclusion.

Some simulations of collective decision-making use the Condorcet method to model the way groups of animals come to consensus.

== See also ==
- Aggregation (ethology)
- Biomimetics
- Collective cell migration
- Collective intelligence
- Emergence
- Herd behavior
- Swarm intelligence
- Animal crossing
