= Elk antipredator behavior =

Antipredatory behaviors are actions an animal performs to reduce or rid themselves of the risk of being prey. Many studies have been done on elk to see what their antipredator behaviors consist of.

One of the most commonly known consequences of the large elk population throughout Yellowstone National Park is the significant decline in the recruitment of aspen (Populus tremuloides). Wolves were reintroduced to the park in 1995 in an effort to restore the park's ecosystem. The elk population subsequently decreased due to wolf predation, allowing the aspen to recuperate and be able to mature once again. The anti-predatory responses moved elk further into the trees and away from young aspen groves. This alteration in elk community structure suggests further consequences following the new anti-predatory response. One of these major costs of anti-predatory behavior of elk is a compromised diet that results in poor health. The ultimate goal of survival takes priority over negative effects associated with these new behaviours. When an animal feels the cost of anti-predatory behaviors, those costs are called risk-effects. Some risk-effects felt by the elk include decreased health due to compromised diet and decreased reproductive rate. This decrease in reproduction rate results in a smaller population size.

== Change in diet ==
Elk (Cervus canadensis) are herbivores that subsist on both grazing and browsing. Consuming browse mitigates the risk of predation, as the animal can avoid being in an open area with its head down. Because of this, one of the elks’ anti-predatory behaviors is shifting from a large majority of grazing to browsing more. This change in diet is closely linked with the elk's habitat change from open grasslands to the edges of tree lines and woody areas.

In Yellowstone National Park, studies have found that when elk sense wolves nearby, the herbivores retreat to the edge of the forest. This in turn means that they do not have the opportunity to eat the grasses they desire but instead must browse more often when they sense the presence of wolves.

This change in diet and habitat provides further safety in the winter, where the more open areas of the elk's habitat are covered in snow. This can restrict movement and therefore make the elk more vulnerable to becoming prey to the carnivores in the area when they cannot easily escape. These snowy areas encourage elk to move to under tree cover. This move will also cause them to increase the amount of browsing time when snow is heavy, compared to normal browse to graze ratios.

=== Cow/calf winter herd ===
A cow/calf winter herd is a herd that consists only of female elk and their young. In a normal winter, defined as one where there is a decent amount of snow fall, one study found that when the groups of cows and calves were safe from predation by wolves, about 75.6-83.0% of their diet was made up of graze. When wolves were present this number dropped to 61.6-69.4%. These results demonstrate that when elk sense the danger of wolves in the area, they reduce the amount of time they spend grazing in order to watch for danger or to retreat to the forest and eat browse instead. This is further demonstrated by cow/calf groups “nearly [doubling] conifer use” when predators were present.

Other studies also showed that cows were more likely than bulls to move to the conifers for protection (Creel, et al., 2005). This likely could be because their calves are most easily preyed upon by wolves and all elk are more likely to be killed in the grasslands than at the forest's edge where there is more cover and protection.

=== Bull winter herd ===
A bull winter herd is one that only consists of male elk, when they split off from the main herd for the winter. Bull groups showed little to no response to the presence of wolves in their grazing habits. When wolves were not in the area, 56.3-69.7% of their diet was grazed foods. These numbers stayed at similar levels at 60.3-72.1% when wolves were present.

The result of all of these changes in habitat and diet resulted in both sexes of elk eating a more similar diet than usual even though the groups were strongly segregated.

== Vigilance level ==
If elk are not alert, they cannot determine the current level of risk. It has been found that vigilance of an animal will increase as the risk of predation increases (Lung and Childress, 2006). Elk seem to be able to sense their predators up to three kilometers away, with the herbivores becoming most alert when their predators are within one kilometer or less of the herd.

For example, if a pack of wolves happens to be further than three kilometers away, then the vigilance of the elk does not heighten because the current risk factor of the wolves has been evaluated as nonexistent. The number of wolves in the pack approaching the herd also affects the amount of vigilance observed in elk herds. There is a much stronger reaction if the pack consists of more than ten wolves. An elk associates a full pack with more danger and less of a chance of being able to run the carnivores off.

Reproductive cows often show more alertness than bulls. For the first six months of their newborn calf's life, the mother spends at least 25% of their time scanning their surroundings compared to bulls who spend less than 10% of their time alert for predators. Come fall, the yearling is old enough to look out for itself and the vigilance of its mother decreases slightly since she no longer has to keep an eye out for predators for two bodies and can focus solely on her own protection (Lung and Childress, 2006).

== Health ==
Elk have a multitude of costs to pay for their antipredator behavior. Because the animals must spend more time paying attention to their surroundings and being on the lookout for predators instead of using that time to graze, they simply do not get as much food as they used to.

In Yellowstone National Park, it was found that there definitely is a “decrease in quantity of food obtained by elk” when wolves, a major predator of elk, are in the area. A specific balance between graze and browse, with graze being in the majority, is needed for elk to be considered healthy. This balance is no longer being met exactly as it should. Because of the habitat change from grassland to forest, a lot of the graze needed in the elks’ diet is being replaced with browse. Before the reintroduction of wolves to Yellowstone, elk did not have to trade forage quality for security.

These diet changes have occurred more in females and calves than in males, however. The bulls do not change as much of their graze time, even if wolves are in the area, because their bodies are not equipped to deal with such poor nutrition right before winter. The little changes they do make in their diet cause them to be in a poor state when winter finally arrives. Because of the decrease in available food during the winter, an adult female elk weighing around 200-kg would have to eat an amount of food greater than the biological maximum that can be consumed by this animal in order to get the necessary nutrients. It is difficult for elk to forage in the winter due to snowfall and lack of suitable live plants. Even without nutrient deficiency from changes in summer foraging patterns, their body conditions deteriorate (Christianson and Creel, 2010). This is just one reason why elk, male and female, have to rely a lot on stored fat and muscle that was gained throughout the rest of the year to meet the needed levels of dietary energy and nitrogen.

== Hormone elevation ==
Stressors can cause a change in the activity of crucial enzymes inside an organism's body. Glucocorticoid hormones help to regulate the activity changes in these enzymes. Some scientists believe that the stress that results from exposure to predators causes an elevation in glucocorticoid stress hormones. Though not yet proven to be true, this predation stress hypothesis says that the effects of the elevation of these hormones can damage the immune system and digestive system in ways that indirectly “reduce survival and reproduction”. Reproduction could also be directly suppressed through the effects on the hypothalamic-pituitary-gonadal axis. The elevation in glucocorticoid stress hormones can be caused by either direct exposure to predators or simply exposure to their odors.

But other scientists have seen that brief pulses of these hormones in response to predators are normal and do not usually cause any long term harm.

== Reproduction ==
Another very costly aspect of these anti-predatory behaviors that is experienced by these elk is a decreased pregnancy rate. Contrary to popular belief, this large decrease is caused by aspects other than simple direct predation from wolves. The elk also suffered from the negative effects of their “behavioral or physiological responses” to the newly introduced carnivores. Since wolves were reintroduced to the park in 1995 there has been a 70% drop in elk numbers (nps.gov). It has become apparent that other things come into play involving this drop besides just the fact that wolves are the number one predator of elk in Yellowstone. There has been a drop in births that cannot be explained solely by the numbers of females preyed upon each year by wolves. A “large decline in pregnancy rates” was detected when the effort was put forth to figure out another possible cause for the decline in population size. This is also supported by the fact that most calves up to six months old are sufficiently protected by their mother and the herd and are not killed by predators. This was shown in one study, where newborn calves were radio-collared and by six months of age they were still alive and healthy. Since the calves themselves are not being killed, this suggests that the reintroduction of wolves has indirectly affected the reproductive rate of elk through the new behaviors they had to adopt in order to avoid predation. There has also been a decline in the calf-to-cow ratio in the herds, which suggests that fewer elk than expected are giving birth. Also, low progesterone levels in elk can be connected with high predation risk. Low progesterone can cause miscarriages and infertility in the females.

One explanation for the drop in new calves is the elk's new diet, which does not provide the nutrition required for a healthy pregnancy. It has been found that elk more than double the number of hours during the day that they spend vigilant and because of this they are decreasing the proportion of time spent feeding by about 19%”. As mentioned above, elk heavily rely on stored fat and energy to make it through the winter. Not getting enough food during the warm months does not give them much to spare. Loss of this fat and body mass could affect the elk pregnancy rate, in that if an elk's body fat drops below a certain percentage, it can become hard for her to sustain a pregnancy.
