= International Society for the Study of Behavioural Development =

International human development learned society

- Abbreviation: ISSBD
- Formation: May 31, 1969; 57 years ago
- Founded at: University of Bonn, Bonn, West Germany
- Type: Membership organization
- Purpose: Research
- Fields: Developmental psychology
- Members: 1200+ from nearly 70 countries globally (2026)
- President: [https://frossomotti.com// Frosso Motti-Stefanidi ]
- Secretary General: Annette Henderson
- Treasurer: Kristine Ajrouch
- Membership Secretary: Pamela Wadende
- Website: issbd.org

The International Society for the Study of Behavioural Development (ISSBD) is an international, multidisciplinary learned society dedicated to research on human development. It was established on May 31, 1969, at the University of Bonn in Bonn, West Germany. It has three associated publications: the International Journal of Behavioral Development, the ISSBD Bulletin, and a quarterly e-newsletter. It was originally registered in Amsterdam, the Netherlands in 1972, with its constitution being ratified in July of that year; in February 1973, it received royal assent from the Queen of the Netherlands.

As of 2026, it had around 1,200+ members from nearly 70 different countries.

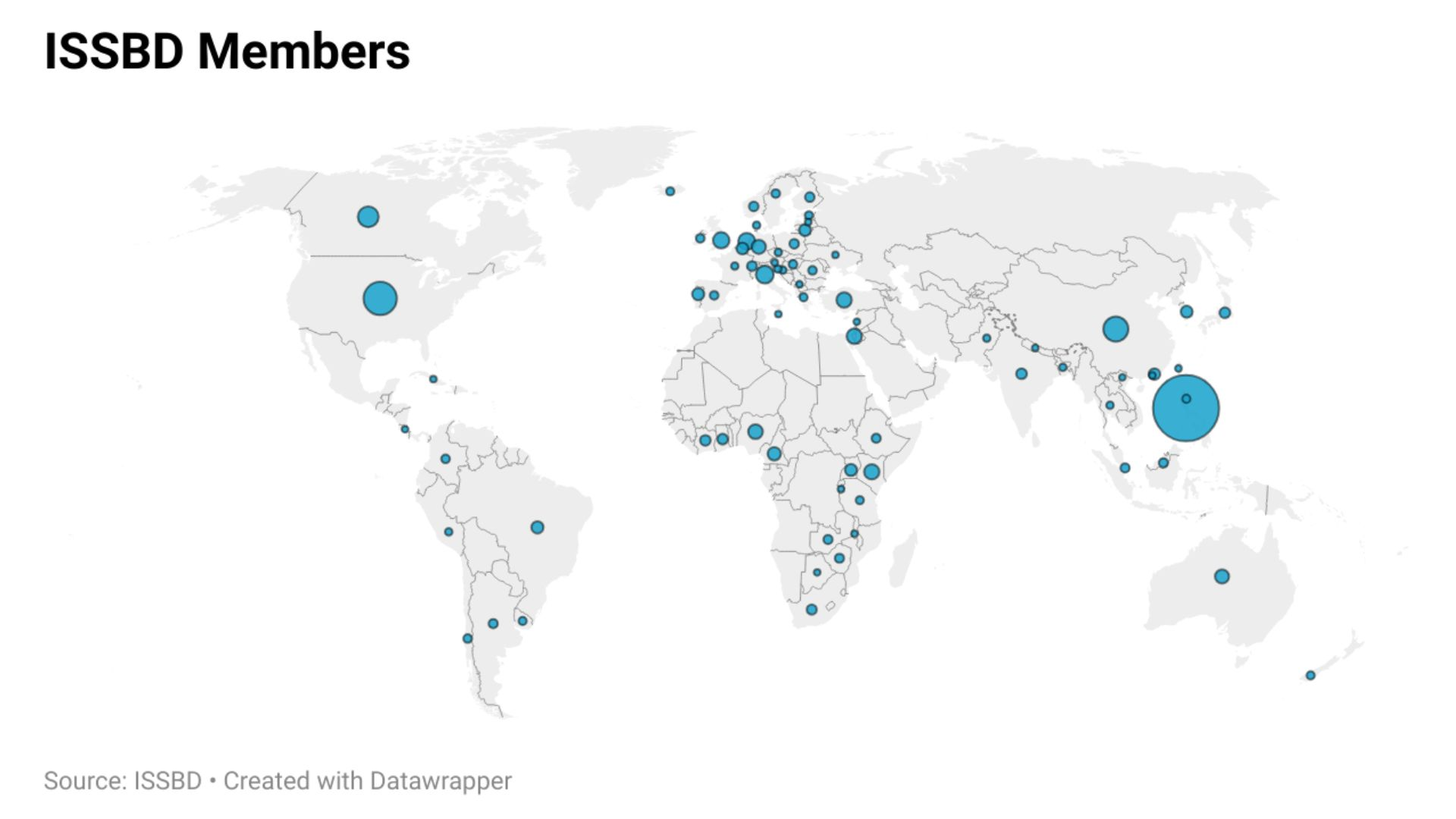

== ISSBD Fellows ==
Elected fellows of the International Society for the Study of Behavioral Development are individuals whose work has exhibited sustained impact on the Developmental Science community.

Name	Institution
Amina Abubakar	Aga Khan University
Abraham Sagi-Schwartz	University of Haifa
Amanda Morris	Oklahoma State University
Ann Sanson	University of Melbourne
Anne Petersen	University of Michigan
Annette Henderson	University of Auckland
Antonio Santos	Instituto Universitário de Ciências Psicológicas, Sociais e da Vida
Avshalom Caspi	Duke University
Bame Nsamenang	University of Bamenda
Barry Schneider	University of Ottawa; Boston College
Berna Guroglu	Leiden University
Biao Sang	East China Normal University
Bonnie L. Barber	Griffith University
Brett Laursen	Florida Atlantic University
Catherine Cooper	University of California Santa Cruz
Charissa Cheah	University of Maryland
Christiane Hoppmann	University of British Columbia
Christiane Spiel	University of Vienna
Christina Salmivalli	University of Turku
Claire Garandeau	University of Turku
Constance Flanagan	University of Wisconsin-Madison
Doran French	Purdue University
Erika Hoff	Florida Atlantic University
Frank Kessel	University of New Mexico
Frosso Motti	National and Kapodistrian University of Athens
Gisela Trommsdorff	University of Konstanz
Godfrey Ejuu	Kyambogo University
Heidi Keller	University of Osnabrück
Ingrid Schoon	University College London
Jacqui Smith	University of Michigan
Jennifer Lansford	Duke University
Joan Miller	The New School for Social Research
Julie Bowker	University at Buffalo
Jutta Heckhausen	University of California Irvine
Karina Weichold	Friedrich Schiller University Jena
Karine Verschueren	KU Leuven
Katariina Salmela-Aro	University of Helsinki
Kenneth H. Rubin	University of Maryland
Kofi Marfo	Aga Khan University
Kristine Ajrouch	University of Michigan
Lea Pulkkinen	University of Jyväskylä
Luc Goosens	University of Leuven
Manuela Verissimo	Instituto Universitário de Ciências Psicológicas, Sociais e da Vida
Marc Bornstein	NICHD
Marcel van Aken	Utrecht University
Mark Stemmler	University of Erlangen-Nuremberg
Melanie Zimmer-Gembeck	Griffith University
Michael Rutter	King’s College London
Nancy Eisenberg	Arizona State University
Nancy Galambos	University of Alberta
Pamela Wadende	Kisii University
Patricio Cumsille	Universidad Católica de Chile
Paul Harris	Harvard University
Paul Oburu	Maseno University
Peter Smith	University of London
Rachel Seginer	University of Haifa
Rainer Silbereisen	Friedrich Schiller University of Jena
René Veenstra	University of Groningen
Richard Tremblay	University of Montreal
Rita Žukauskienė	Mykolas Romeris University
Robert Coplan	Carleton University
Robert Crosnoe	University of Texas at Austin
Robert Serpell	University of Zambia
Sabine Walper	LMU Munich
Silvia Koller	Universidade Federal do Rio Grande do Sul
Stephen Russell	Arizona State University
Suman Verma	Panjab University
Susan Branje	Utrecht University
Terrie Moffitt	Duke University
Therese Tchombe	University of Buea
Tina Malti	University of Toronto; Leipzig University
Todd Little	Texas Tech University
Toni Antonucci	University of Michigan
Toon Cillessen	Radboud University
Willard W. Hartup	University of Minnesota
Willem Koops	Utrecht University
William Bukowski	Concordia University
Wolfgang Schneider	University of Würzburg
Wyndol Furman	University of Denver
Xinyin Chen	University of Pennsylvania
Zena Mello	San Francisco State University
Zhaolan Meng	Peking University
