= Stemmler =

Stemmler or Stemler is a surname of German origin. It may refer to:

- Antonie Stemmler (1892–1976), German teacher, nurse and member of the fascist resistance
- Gust Stemmler (1899–1986), American politician
- Mark Stemmler (born 1960), American scientist
- Steven R. Stemler (born 1960), American politician
