= Silbereisen =

Silbereisen is a German language surname, meaning "silver iron" in the German language. Notable people with the name include:

- Florian Silbereisen (born 1981), German Schlager singer and show host
- Kristin Silbereisen (born 1985), German table tennis player
- Rainer K. Silbereisen (born 1944), German psychologist
