= List of Southwestern University alumni =

Following is a list of notable alumni from Southwestern University.

== Business ==
- James Marion West Jr. – Texas oil, timber, and ranching tycoon

== Clergy ==
- Hiram Abiff Boaz – Methodist bishop and former president of SMU
- Stanley Hauerwas – Theologian and ethicist
- Jay W. Richards – philosopher, theologian, economist, apologist, social researcher, author
- William Angie Smith – Methodist bishop

== Education ==
- Hiram Abiff Boaz – Methodist bishop and former president of SMU
- Serena DeBeer – adjunct professor at Cornell University and head of department for Inorganic Spectroscopy at Max Planck Institute for Chemical Energy Conversion
- Laura Kuykendall (1883–1935) – dean of women at Southwestern 1918–1935
- Margaret (Young) Menzel – Florida State University scientist (1924–1987)
- Amanda Sheffield Morris – Regents Professor of Psychology at Oklahoma State University

== Entertainment ==
- Bill Engvall – stand-up comedian
- Jerry Hardin – actor
- Claude Porter White – author and composer of operas
- Susan Youens – musicologist

== Law ==
- William H. Atwell – U.S. district court judge
- J. Marvin Jones – U.S. Court of Claims chief judge and U.S.cCongressman from Texas (1917–1940)
- Joseph Tyree Sneed, III – U.S. court of appeals judge
- Brent Webster – acting Texas attorney general

== Literature and journalism ==
- J. Frank Dobie – author
- Abbie Graham – author
- Hubert Renfro Knickerbocker – Pulitzer Prize-winning journalist and author
- John Murrell – Canadian playwright, member of the Order of Canada

== Non-profit ==
- Ernesto Nieto – founder and president of the National Hispanic Institute
- Annie Clo Watson – social worker based in San Francisco

== Politics ==
- Jessie Daniel Ames – civil rights activist
- Joan Bray – state senator in Missouri
- Robert L. Henry – U.S. congressman from Texas (1897–1917), chairman of the House Rules Committee
- J. Marvin Jones – U.S. congressman from Texas (1917–1940), U.S. Court of Claims chief judge
- Earle Bradford Mayfield – U.S. senator from Texas (1923–1929)
- Pete Sessions – U.S. congressman from Texas (2013–present), chairman of the House Rules Committee
- R. Ewing Thomason – U.S. congressman from Texas (1931–1947), mayor of El Paso
- John Tower – U.S. senator from Texas (1961–1988)
- Clayton Tucker – Texas agriculture commissioner-elect

== Science ==
- Robert Simpson – meteorologist, former director of the National Hurricane Center, and co-developer of the Saffir-Simpson Hurricane Scale

== Sports ==
- Harry Ables – Major League Baseball pitcher
- Mike Anderson – Major League Baseball pitcher and current pro scout with the Texas Rangers
- Solon Barnett – offensive tackle and guard for the Chicago Cardinals and Green Bay Packers (1945–1946)
- Pete Cawthon – head football coach and athletic director of the Texas Tech Red Raiders
- Carlton Massey – defensive lineman and pro bowler for the Cleveland Browns and Green Bay Packers (1954–1958)
- Carl Reynolds – Major League Baseball player and member of Texas Sports Hall of Fame; played for five teams over 12 years
- Mike Timlin – Major League Baseball pitcher
