= Denis Gerstorf =

German psychologist

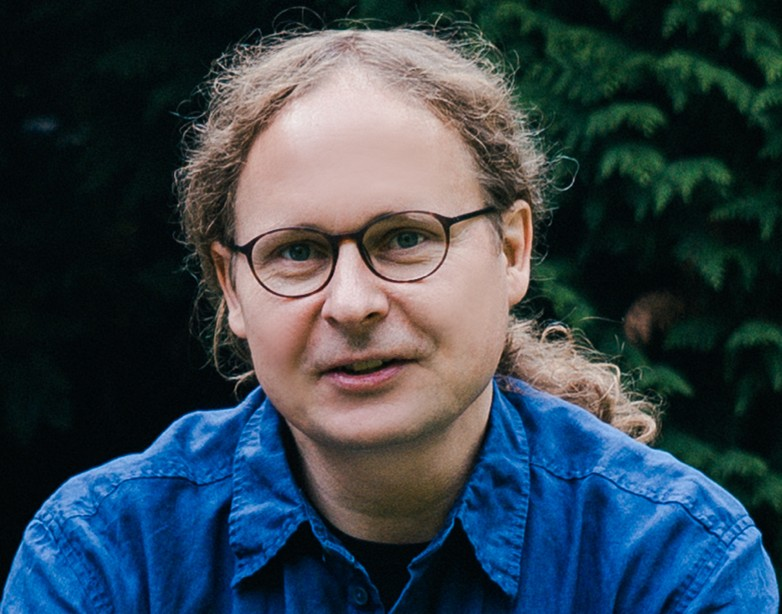
Prof. Dr. Denis Gerstorf, Professor für Entwicklungspsychologie an der Humboldt-Universität zu Berlin

Denis Gerstorf (born 1976) is a German psychologist and professor of developmental psychology at Humboldt University of Berlin, Germany. His research is focused on lifelong development, as well as on the role of historical change for adult development and aging and the interlinkage of developmental processes across various different time scales.

== Career ==
Denis Gerstorf studied psychology at Free University of Berlin, where he completed his degree in 2001 with a diploma thesis on psychological predictors of longevity among centenarians. In 2004, he was awarded a doctorate for his dissertation on heterogeneity and differential development in old age from a systemic and holistic perspective.

Following his time at the Max Planck Institute for Human Development in Berlin, Gerstorf worked as a postdoctoral scholar at the University of Virginia in Charlottesville (2005–2007), before taking up in 2007 a position as assistant professor at Pennsylvania State University in State College. In 2011, he was appointed as professor of developmental and educational psychology at Humboldt University of Berlin. Since 2015, Gerstorf is the speaker of the interdisciplinary, multi-institutional consortium of the Berlin Aging Study II (BASE-II). There, he leads the psychology unit, which focuses on psychosocial aspects such as well-being, personality, and stress regulation. In addition, since 2011 he has been a research fellow of the Socio-Economic Panel (SOEP) at the German Institute for Economic Research (DIW Berlin). Between 2011 and 2021, Gerstorf also held the position of adjunct professor at Pennsylvania State University.

== Editorial roles ==
Gerstorf has served in several different roles as (co-)editor of peer-reviewed academic journals, including Gerontology, Psychology and Aging and the International Journal of Behavioral Development. Alongside Christiane Hoppmann, Gerstorf is the incoming co-editor of the 10th edition of the Handbook of the Psychology of Aging series.

== Research ==
The work from Gerstorf and colleagues on the changing nature of age and aging has shown that older adults—particularly in Europe and North America—are now often cognitively and physically healthier, happier, and more content than their age peer several decades ago. They tend to feel less lonely and perceive greater control over their lives. Gerstorf and colleagues showed that today's 75-year-olds display cognitive performance comparable to that of 56-year-olds in the early 1990s Recent research of Gerstorf has documented worsening in multiple psychosocial factors such as loneliness for middle-aged adults in the US, comparing them to other countries as well as previous US generations. Comparable trends are evident in other areas of life, such as cognitive performance and physical health. Other topics in Gerstorf's research include the phenomenon of terminal decline, and the interplay of developmental processes across multiple time scales—from moment-to-moment changes throughout the day to broader trends spanning years and decades. This research has demonstrated significant and lasting influence of environmental and social factors on individual functioning and development.

== Recognition ==
Gerstorf has received the Early Career Achievement Award in Research on Adult Development and Aging from the American Psychological Association (Division 20), the Early Career Contributions Award in Behavioral and Social Gerontology from the Gerontological Society of America,), and election as a Fellow of the same society. In 2020, he received the Richard Kalish Innovative Publication Article Award from the Gerontological Society of America, for a conjoint work with Hans-Werner Wahl.
