= Tom Snijders =

British statistician and methodologist (born 1949)

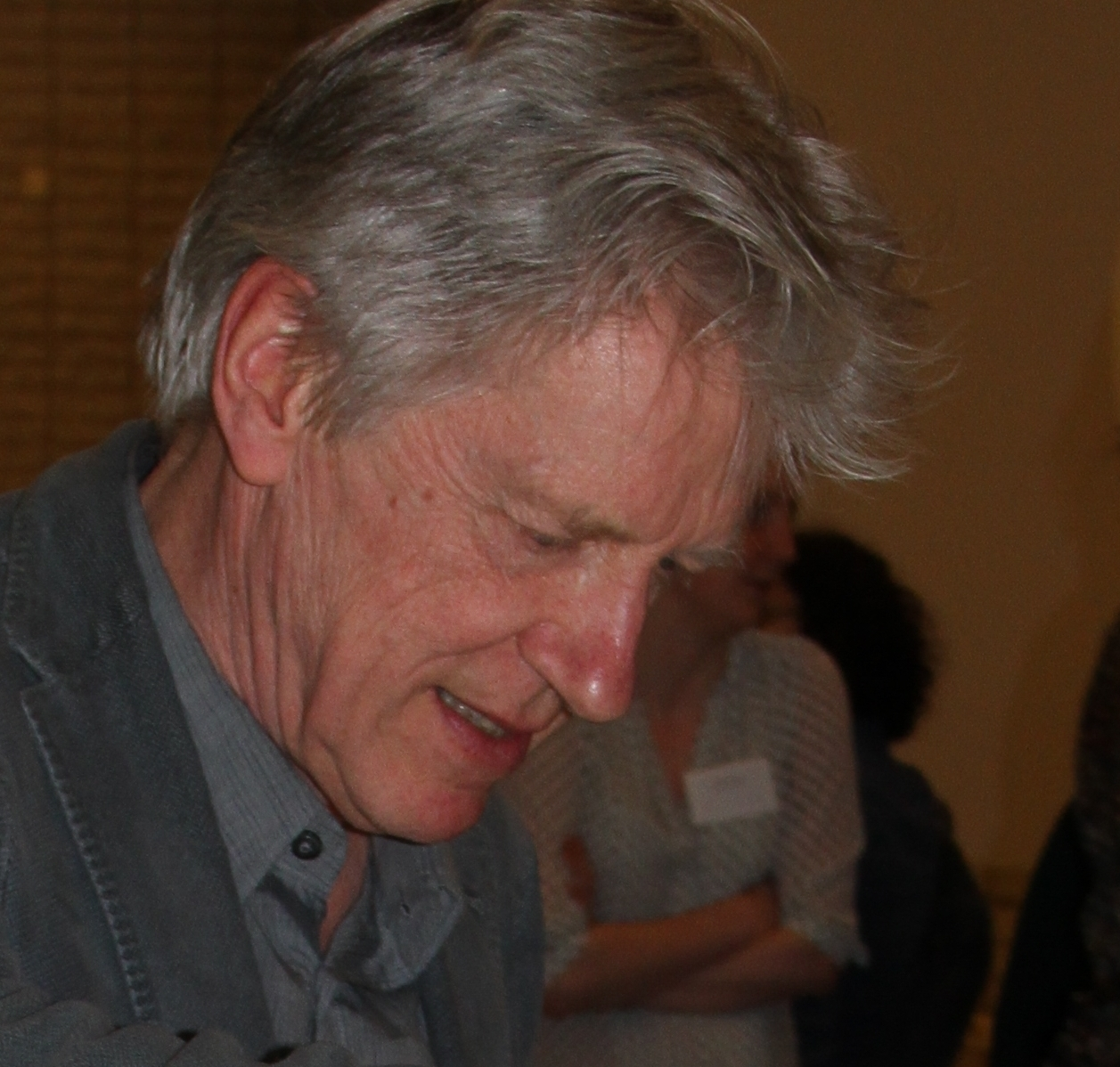
- Snijders in 2015
- Born: Thomas Augustinus Benedictus Snijders; September 26, 1949 (age 77); Tilburg, Netherlands

Academic background
- Education: University of Groningen
- Thesis: Asymptotic Optimality Theory for Testing Problems with Restricted Alternatives (1979)
- Doctoral advisor: Willem Schaafsma

Thomas Augustinus Benedictus Snijders, often simplified as Tom Snijders (born 26 September 1949) is professor of Statistics in the Social Sciences at Nuffield College, Oxford, one of the constituent colleges of the University of Oxford (since 1 October 2006). He is also professor of Methodology at the University of Groningen, a position he has held for more than twenty years.

== Career ==
Tom Snijders was born in Tilburg, a son of Jan Snijders, professor of Psychology at Groningen University from 1949 to 1980, and Nan Snijders-Oomen, an internationally well-known child psychologist (author of the SON nonverbal intelligence test, 1943, 1978, 1991).

Snijders grew up in the province of Groningen, in the northern part of the Netherlands. He was awarded a cum laude Ph.D. at the University of Groningen in mathematics, specializing in mathematical statistics, for his thesis Asymptotic optimality theory for testing problems with restricted alternatives. His thesis advisor was Willem Schaafsma. Since 1985 he worked as a professor of various forms of mathematics serving social science. He was part-time professor of Mathematical Sociology at Utrecht University from 1989-1992 and is an honorary senior fellow of the University of Melbourne in Australia. Stockholm University made him an honorary doctor in 2005, as did Paris Dauphine University in 2011. In 2007 Snijders became correspondent of the Royal Netherlands Academy of Arts and Sciences. In 2008 Snijders was awarded the Order of Knight of the Netherlands Lion.

Many of his former Ph.D. students and postdocs have found academic positions and are at the forefront of their terrain, including Roel Bosker, Marijtje van Duijn, Roger Leenders, Chris Snijders, Albertine J. (Tineke) Oldehinkel, Rafael Wittek, René Veenstra, Marcel van Assen, Christian Steglich, Miranda Lubbers, Per Block, and Nynke Niezink.

== Social networks ==
Snijders is a prominent researcher in the field of statistic methods in behavioural and social sciences. In 1998, together with others, he created Stocnet, an open software system for the advanced statistical analysis of social networks. Snijders is working especially in social network analysis: statistical methods for analysing social networks and in network evolution, in social science, mathematical sociology and mathematical response theory, and also in multilevel models analysis, about which he wrote a textbook, titled Multilevel Analysis. An Introduction to Basic and Advanced Multilevel Modeling (1999). Apart from this he developed new statistical methods for social science applications, often in combination with the development of computer software to implement these methods. Together with professor Patrick Doreian of the University of Pittsburgh Tom Snijders edited the international scientific journal Social networks. An international journal of structural analysis.

== Sources and links ==
- Nuffield College, Sociology Group
- University of Groningen, Faculty of Behavioural and Social Sciences
- Social Network Analysis page of Tom Snijders
- Social networks. An international journal of structural analysis
- Website of Tom Snijders with a full list of functions, publications and interests
- Knipscheer, Corn.J.: XIX generaties Oome- Oomen- Oomens- Oomes. Breda, 1984.
- Snijders, Jan: Snijders-Oomen. Een levens- en familieverhaal. Den Haag, 1997.
