= Individualistic culture =

Culture that emphasizes individualism

Individualistic cultures are characterized by individualism, which is the prioritization or emphasis of the individual over the entire group. In individualistic cultures, people are motivated by their own preference and viewpoints. Individualistic cultures focus on abstract thinking, privacy, self-dependence, uniqueness, and personal goals. The term individualistic culture was first used in the 1980s by Dutch social psychologist Geert Hofstede to describe countries and cultures that are not collectivist; Hofstede created the term individualistic culture when he created a measurement for the five dimensions of cultural values.

People in individualistic cultures see each other as loosely connected and have a diverse population of different races, ethnicities, languages, and cultures. Individuals gain the most happiness from three key factors: personal satisfaction, internal happiness, and family satisfaction. People living in individualistic cultures use direct communication, low-power distance communication, self-expression of emotions, and a variety of conflict resolution strategies.

There has been a global increase in individualism in the recent years and individualistic culture is on the rise in many countries around the world due to wealth and urbanization. Highly individualistic countries are often Western countries, like Australia, Canada, Germany, the Netherlands, Switzerland, and the United States.

== The rise of individualistic culture ==
The rise of individualistic culture is a result of the integration of diverse cultures. The migration and meeting of cultures on a global level flourish in countries with political ideologies that allow freedom of self expression. A fertile atmosphere of freedom encourages the individual in self pursuit of personal growth. Individualistic culture has its focus on the individual mentality in society as opposed to the societal structure of the collective mentality. There has been much discussion about individualistic culture as opposed to a collectivism culture. One, the individualistic culture, promotes individualism or independent pursuits not associated with a group, while, in contrast, collectivism discourages the independence of the individual to develop a oneness of the masses with shared goals and ideology as in a group. Many thoughts and observations on individualism have been shared by noted intellectuals in philosophy, psychology and economics. In each of these schools of thought are Friedrich Nietzsche, Ludwig Mises, and Geert Hofstede. Among the 3 of these scholars Geert Hofstede is most notable. It was Hofstede's study of culture and society in various countries which resulted in the term "individualistic culture", as a concept of social psychology solely attributed to him.

== Low-power distance ==
Low-power distance includes power distance which is the degree to which unequal distribution of power is accepted and present in a culture. Individualistic cultures are referred to as low-power distance cultures that contains a hierarchy system, that strives for equality, and rejects inequality. Low-power distance countries are Austria, Costa Rica, New Zealand, and South Africa. Low-power distance countries challenge authority, encourage a reduction of power differences between management and employees, promote the distribution and use of power fairly, and focus on the unique skill of a person. People in low-power distance cultures challenge social norms, are creative, and outspoken. Though low-power distance cultures challenge authority, their appreciation of diversity allows people to perform better in group work than collectivist cultures. People from low-power distance cultures appreciate abstract thinking and combine their different opinions and ideas to work together and develop solutions to problems in group work.

Low-Power Distance behavior, as a characteristic, is more evident and commonly associated with diverse cultural backgrounds. The rights of the individual take precedence over the collective, and instead, minimizes the juxtaposition of the power distance relationship in individualistic culture resulting in the Low-Power distance dimension as set forth by Geert Hofstede’s observations on cultural dimensions.

== Emotion display and display rules ==
Individualistic cultures tend to prioritize the individual person over the group, and this can be seen in how the display rules vary from a collectivist culture compared to an individualistic culture. Display rules are the rules that exist in different cultures that determine how emotion should be displayed publicly.

In an individualistic culture, self-expression is highly valued, making the display rules less strict and allowing people to display intense emotion such as: happiness, anger, love, etc. While in a collectivist culture, moderation and self-control is highly valued for the well-being of the group, and collectivist cultures therefore tend to restrain from showing emotion in public.

One common misunderstanding is to equate individualism with selfishness, coldness, indifference to others, and competition. For example, a survey of researchers found that many expected people in individualistic cultures to agree more with the survey item, "winning is everything" and agree less with the item "To me, pleasure is spending time with others." However, actual survey results show that people in collectivistic cultures tend to agree more with the competition statement and less with the "pleasure is spending time with others" item. Instead, the more reliable difference is that people in individualistic cultures tend to agree more with items about autonomy and broad pro-sociality, whereas people in collectivistic cultures tend to agree more with items that describe concrete behavioral duties in close relationships.

== Marriage and family dynamics ==
In 1994 Ruth K. Chao, argued that "parenting styles developed on North American samples cannot be simply translated to other cultures, but instead must reflect their sociocultural contexts". Many cultures have different styles of parenting and the dynamics those families are also different.

People from individualistic cultures usually look out for themselves and their immediate family only. While people from collectivistic cultures look out for their community or group, as well as their family. Harald Wallbott and Klaus Scherer suggest that in cultures that are collectivist and high in power, parents use real shame in their parenting styles. Whereas in individualistic cultures that are low in power, and are uncertainty-avoidance, shame more closely resembles guilt in their parent style. For example, in Asian collectivistic cultures shame is a highly valued emotional response. So much so, that in Japan, which is considered to be a collectivistic culture, many people commit suicide after dishonoring or bringing shame to their family or community.

=== Work-family balance ===
One's cultural style can also interfere with work-family relationship dynamics between different cultures. In Shan Xu research he found that employees from more individualistic cultures are more sensitive to how their work interferes with their family life. These employees are more concerned about their own individual family dynamics and structure. While people from more collectivistic cultures are more concerned about how their work provides material, social, and cognitive resources such as intelligence and experience which will help their families. These employees are more focused on the overall and harmony of all those little factors and how they affect their families.

== Conflict strategies ==
Conflict strategies are methods used to resolve different problems. There are different approaches to resolving a conflict and depending on the culture a person is brought up in, the more likely it is for them to use a certain approach. Since individualistic culture sets greater value to personal achievement, contrary to collectivist cultures who value harmony, it is more likely for a person from an individualistic culture to use competition as their method of resolving conflict.

When using competition as an approach to resolving conflict, a person is more confrontational and seeks to achieve his or her own goals with no regard of the goals of others. Using this approach, a person seeks domination, which means to get others to do what the person wants instead of what they initially wanted. On the contrary, a collectivist culture would more likely use a less confrontational approach such as accommodation to end the conflict with compromise so that each party is benefited.

== See also ==
- Collectivistic culture
- Cross-cultural communication
- Self-enhancement
