= Stemler =

Stemler is a surname. Notable people with the surname include:

- Markus Stemler, German sound engineer
- Steven R. Stemler, American politician
