= Stephen T. Russell =

American sociologist (born 1966)

- Born: 1966 (age 59–60)

Academic background
- Education: Wake Forest University (B.A.); College of William & Mary (M.A.); Duke University (Ph.D.)
- Thesis: Life Course Antecedents of Premarital Conception in Great Britain (1994)
- Doctoral advisor: Alan Kerckhoff
- Other advisors: Gary A. Kreps; Glen Elder

Academic work
- Discipline: Sociology
- Sub-discipline: Adolescent development, sexuality, LGBT youth
- Institutions: University of Nebraska–Lincoln; UC Davis College of Agricultural and Environmental Sciences; University of Arizona; University of Texas at Austin

Stephen Thomas Russell (born 1966) is an American sociologist, Foundation Professor, and Director of T. Denny Sanford School of Social and Family Dynamics at Arizona State University. From 2015 to 2025 he was the Priscilla Pond Flawn Regents Professor in Child Development at University of Texas at Austin. Russell was a distinguished professor and Fitch Nesbitt Endowed Chair in Family and Consumer Sciences at University of Arizona from 2007 to 2015. He researches adolescent development, sexuality, LGBT youth, and parent-adolescent relationships.

== Education ==
Russell earned a B.A. in sociology from Wake Forest University in 1988. From 1988 to 1989, Russell worked as a research assistant in the department of sociology at College of William & Mary where he a M.A. His graduate thesis was titled Role Enactment and Disaster Response: A Methodological Exploration. His advisor was Gary A. Kreps. From 1989 to 1990, Russell was a research sociologist in the department of psychiatry at Uniformed Services University of the Health Sciences. In 1994, Russell completed a Ph.D. in sociology at Duke University. His dissertation was titled Life Course Antecedents of Teenage Parenthood in Great Britain. Alan Kerckhoff was his doctoral advisor. From 1994 to 1997, Russell was a postdoctoral research associate at University of North Carolina at Chapel Hill Carolina Population Center. His life course studies program coordinator was Glen Elder.

== Career ==
From 1997 to 1999, Russell was an assistant professor and extension specialist in the department of family and consumer sciences at the University of Nebraska–Lincoln. He was an assistant specialist in cooperative extension in the department of human and community development at the UC Davis College of Agricultural and Environmental Sciences from 1999 to 2001. He served as an associate specialist in cooperative extension and director of the 4-H Center for Youth Development at UC Davis from 2001 to 2004. Russell was a distinguished visiting professor of human sexuality studies at San Francisco State University from 2001 to 2008. From 2004 to 2007, Russell was associate professor in the division of family studies and human development in the Norton School of Family and Consumer Sciences at University of Arizona (UA) College of Agriculture and Life Sciences. Russell served as the distinguished professor and Fitch Nesbitt Endowed Chair in Family and Consumer Sciences at UA from 2007 to 2015. He was also the director of the Frances McClelland Institute for Children, Youth and Families and an affiliated faculty member in sociology, psychology, gender and women’s studies, school of mind, brain, and behavior. Russell was the interim director of the John & Doris Norton School of Family and Consumer Sciences from 2012 to 2015. In 2015, Russell became the Priscilla Pond Flawn Regents Professor in Child Development in the department of human development and family sciences at University of Texas at Austin. He is an affiliated faculty member of sociology, and the population research center. He became chair of the department of human development and family services in 2016. After ten years at the University of Texas at Austin, in July 2025, Russell became the Director of the T. Denny Sanford School of Social and Family Dynamics Arizona State University.

=== Research ===
Russell studies adolescent development focusing on adolescent sexuality, LGBT youth, and parent-adolescent relationships. Russell states that his "research is guided by a commitment to create social change to support healthy adolescent development."

== Selected works ==
=== Books ===
- Russell, Stephen T.; Kosciw, Joseph; Horn, Stacey; Saewyc, Elizabeth (2010). Safe Schools Policy for LGBTQ Students. Social Policy Report. Volume 24, Number 4. ERIC Clearinghouse.
- Russell, Stephen T.; Crockett, Lisa J.; Chao, Ruth K. (2010). Asian American Parenting and Parent-Adolescent Relationships. Springer Science & Business Media. ISBN 9781441957283.
- Russell, Stephen Thomas; Horn, Stacey S. (2017). Sexual Orientation, Gender Identity, and Schooling: The Nexus of Research, Practice, and Policy. Oxford University Press. ISBN 9780199387656.

== Awards and honors ==
Russell received the Wayne F. Placek Award from the American Psychological Foundation in 2000. In 2004, he was elected full member of the International Academy of Sex Research. He served as president of the Society for Research on Adolescence from 2012 to 2014. Russell was elected fellow of the National Council on Family Relations in 2017.
