= Anne Petersen =

Anne Petersen may refer to:

- Anne C. Petersen (born 1944), American psychologist
- Anne Helen Petersen, American writer and journalist
- Ann Petersen, Belgian actress
