= Candice Feiring =

Professor of pediatrics and psychiatry

Dr. Candice Feiring is a Senior Research Scholar at the College of New Jersey and has been a professor of pediatrics and psychiatry at University of Medicine and Dentistry of New Jersey. She is the Director of the Center for Youth Relationship and Development. Her research focuses on processes (such as shame, attribution and social support) related to adjustment in sexually abused youth and adolescent romantic relationships. Dr. Feiring has been honored with a William T. Grant Faculty Scholars award and has been the recipient of federally funded grants from the National Institute of Mental Health, Department of Justice, and Department of Education. She serves on the Editorial Board of the Journal of Research on Adolescence and is the Editor of Child Maltreatment. She was a member of the NIMH "Psychosocial development, risk and prevention" study section, the New Jersey Governor's Council on Mental Retardation and Developmental Disabilities (2003–2007)and is an advisor for the National Center of Child Traumatic Stress. Dr. Feiring is the principal investigator on an NIMH supported longitudinal study of processes related to adjustment following the discovery of sexual abuse. This project spans development from childhood into young adulthood and has been instrumental in guiding theory and intervention for youth with a history of sexual abuse. The research from this study was awarded the 2003 American Professional Society on the Abuse of Children Research Award. She has been selected as the next Editor-in-Chief of the Journal of Child Maltreatment.
