= Rita Fleming =

American politician

Member of the Indiana House of Representatives from the 71st district
- In office November 7, 2018 – May 13, 2024
- Preceded by: Steven R. Stemler
- Succeeded by: Wendy Dant Chesser

Personal details
- Party: Democratic
- Education: Murray State University; Vanderbilt University; University of Louisville

Rita Fleming is an American politician. She served as a Democratic member for the 71st district of the Indiana House of Representatives.

Fleming studied at Murray State University as an undergraduate, and as a postgraduate at Vanderbilt University and the University of Louisville. Fleming has worked as a registered nurse, nurse practitioner, and obstretician and gynecologist.

In 2018, she was elected for the 71st district of the Indiana House of Representatives, succeeding Steven R. Stemler, and assumed office on November 7, 2018. She was re-elected in 2020 and 2022.

Fleming resigned from the Indiana House on May 13, 2024.
