= Hans Ormel =

Psychiatric epidemiologist

Johan "Hans" Ormel (born 1946 in Wageningen) is a psychiatric epidemiologist known for his scientific work in clinical and health psychology, psychiatry, gerontology and medical sociology. Officially retired since 2014, Ormel continues to teach psychiatric epidemiology and to participate in research projects.

== Education ==
Ormel graduated in 1964 from the HBS-B in Veenendaal, Netherlands, and received his bachelor in sociology from the University of Groningen in 1968. In 1973 he received his master in sociology at the University of Groningen. In 1980 he finished his Ph.D. thesis about subjective well-being under the title “Difficulty with life or a difficult life”.

== Career ==
Between 1980 and 1984 Ormel was assistant professor at the department of psychiatry. In 1994 he was appointed professor of Social Epidemiology. Beginning in 1996 he held a chair in Social Psychiatry, in particular Psychiatric Epidemiology, at the University of Groningen. He has been a visiting professor at the University of Washington, the Center for Health Studies in Seattle and the Institute of Psychiatry in London, and fellow-in-residence at the Netherlands Institute for Advanced Study (NIAS) in the Humanities and Social Sciences of the KNAW. He was the principal investigator in the large-scale research projects Myocardial Infarction and Depression-Intervention Trial (MIND-IT) and First-line Intervention Study (INSTEL).

In 2001, Ormel and his Rotterdam colleague Frank Verhulst founded the long-term research project TRAILS (TRacking Adolescents’ Individual Lives Survey). This research tracks the physical and mental development of over 2500 adolescents in the north of the Netherlands and has led to results for preventive and curative treatments. Many of his former Ph.D. students and postdocs have found academic positions and are at the forefront of their terrain, including Albertine J. (Tineke) Oldehinkel, Peter de Jonge, and René Veenstra.

In 2007 Ormel founded the Interdisciplinary Center Psychopathology and Emotion Regulation at the University of Groningen. On 23 January 2014 Ormel was made a Knight in the Order of the Netherlands Lion. He retired in 2014 and intended to continue teaching part time and to continue work on TRAILS and other research projects.

== Selected publications ==
- Ormel J, et al. Quality of life and social production functions: a framework for understanding health effects. Soc Sci Med. 1997 Oct;45(7):1051-63. PMID 9257397
- Ormel J, et al. Subjective Well-Being and Social Production Functions Social Indicators Research 1999, 46(1): 61–90
- Riese, H, et al. Timing of Stressful Life Events Affects Stability and Change of Neuroticism European Journal of Personality 2014, 28(2):2403–15
