= Social network advertising =

Advertising on social media services

Social network advertising, also known as social media targeting, is a group of terms used to describe forms of online advertising and digital marketing that focus on social networking services. Advertisers can use users' demographic information, psychographics, and other data points to target their ads.

Social media targeting combines targeting options (such as geotargeting, behavioural targeting, and socio-psychographic targeting) to make detailed target group identification possible. The signals used include users' likes, comments, views, and follows on social media platforms. Advertisements are then distributed on the basis of information gathered from target group profiles.

Social network advertising differs from social media targeting. Social media targeting uses profile data to deliver advertisements to individual users, whereas social network advertising involves matching social network users to target groups specified by the advertiser. Social media advertising encompasses the creation of content on social media platforms, interaction with followers, and the placement of advertisements.

== Application ==
People who use social networking sites disclose personal information data points about themselves, including their age, gender, interests, and location, and this stored information allows advertisers to define target groups and to individualize their advertisements. Advertisers use it to reach audiences identified as interested in a product or service, and users may in turn see advertisements more closely matched to their interests. The data collected extends beyond demographics to the content a user has engaged with and the length of that engagement.

=== Facebook ===
Facebook provides targeting tools that allow advertisements to be directed at a defined audience through the Facebook Ads product, which is available to individual users and to businesses. When an advertisement is placed through the Facebook Ad Manager, or the Meta Ads Manager, the advertiser selects characteristics that define the target market, among them geographical location, gender, age, occupation, relationship status, and interests such as music. Facebook states that advertisers can further refine an audience by behaviour, such as purchasing patterns and device usage, and that this makes advertisements less intrusive and better matched to their audience. The system also reports campaign performance, which advertisers can use to adjust the audience, budget, and duration of a campaign. Its campaign tools are free to access and reach a large user base, factors that have been cited as reasons for the platform's use by new advertisers.

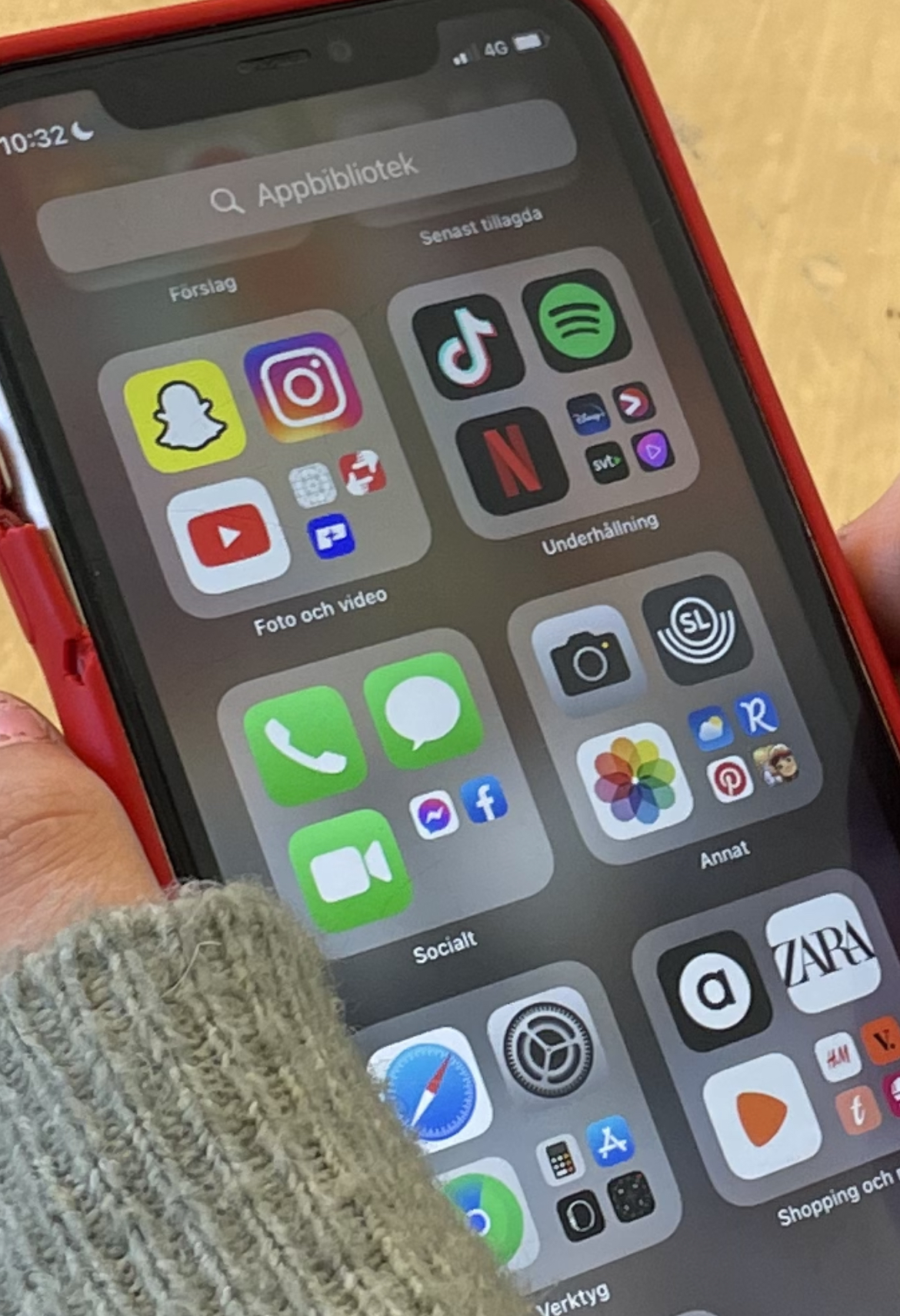
Various social media apps on an iPhone

=== Instagram ===
On Instagram, companies can engage influencers, post from a corporate account, or buy advertising from Meta, Instagram's parent company. Advertising systems assess how a user engages with content, drawing on the number of likes, follows, and recorded interests, and select advertisements on that basis. Average daily use of the app has been reported at about 72 minutes.

=== LinkedIn ===
LinkedIn was created as an online platform to help employers connect with potential employees. Its most common advertising format is sponsored content, which is used to distribute posts and company updates and to direct users to a landing page. Other popular formats include Thought Leadership ads and Document ads. Targeting attributes include location, company, job experience, education, demographics, interests, and traits, as well as custom audiences assembled through matched audiences.

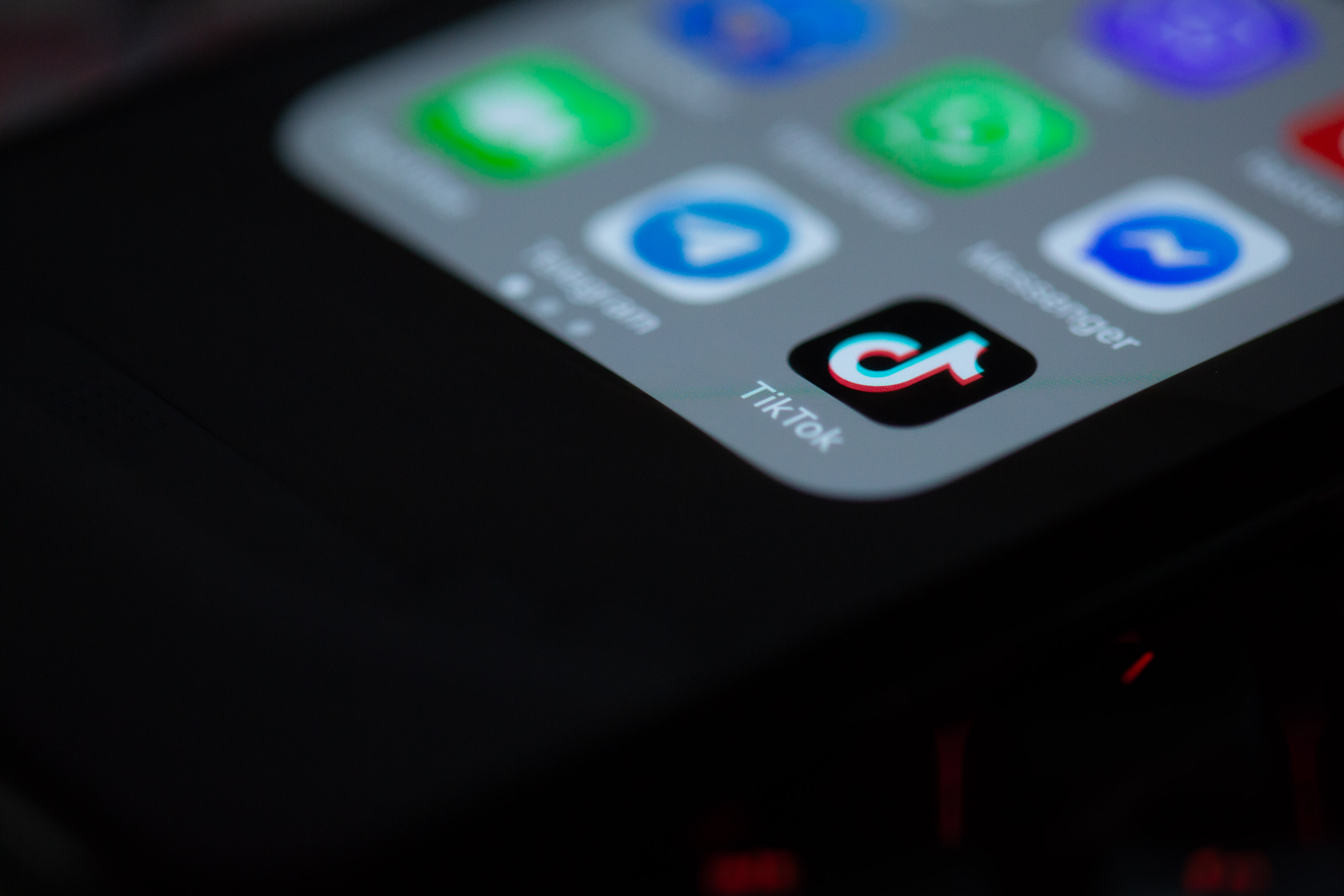
A fast-growing social media app called TikTok

=== WhatsApp ===
In 2020, Facebook, which owns WhatsApp, announced that it would show advertising on the platform through WhatsApp statuses, in a format comparable to Instagram and Facebook stories.

=== YouTube ===
According to figures attributed to Hootsuite, 45.8% of YouTube's total advertising audience is female and 54.2% is male.

== Operation ==
Within social communities, users provide demographic information, interests, and images. Social media targeting software draws on this information and enables advertisers to create display ads with characteristics matching those of social network users. Targeting on this basis increases the likelihood that a user sees advertisements related to their interests. The same data supports the analysis and reporting of campaign results.

=== Demographics ===
As of 2014, about three-quarters of Internet users belonged to at least one social network. 49% of adult women in the United States visited social media sites a few times daily, compared with 34% of men. The fastest-growing age group on Twitter was 55 to 64, up 79% since 2012, while the 45–54 group was the fastest-growing on Facebook and Google+. Use was more common in the 18–29 age group, of whom 89% were Internet users, than among those aged 65 and over, of whom 43% were.

=== Types of advertising ===
Facebook, Twitter, and YouTube each offer several formats for advertising brands. Facebook options include promoted posts, sponsored stories, page post ads, Facebook object (like) ads, and external website (standard) ads. Twitter formats include promoted tweets, promoted trends, and promoted accounts shown in users' news feeds. YouTube formats include branded channels, promoted videos, and video advertising.

In July 2015, during its second quarter earnings call, Facebook reported $2.9 billion in mobile revenue, amounting to over 76% of its overall quarterly revenue. A large portion of this revenue came from app install ads, which developers buy on a cost-per-install basis.

A further format is the buy button. Some networks incorporate buy buttons or act as direct marketers for products a business promotes on its social media presence, and Facebook and Twitter have entered such partnerships. The buttons appear within advertisements in social media news feeds and give users the option to purchase an item immediately. They accounted for just under 2% of online sales. The buy button has been traced to a system patented by Amazon in 1997.

Social media advertising has also been used in political campaigns. Videos involving Barack Obama and John McCain during the 2008 presidential race attracted 1.45 billion views. Okazaki and Taylor have written that social media affects how a brand is received across international markets, and that this raises theoretical questions for research on international advertising.

== Strategy ==
Social media advertising involves creating content on social media platforms, engaging with followers, and running advertisements.

=== Planning and publishing ===
Campaign planning covers the intended audience, the choice of platform on which that audience can be reached, and the content to be produced. Formats in common use include short-form videos, user-created content, and photo campaigns.

=== Listening and engagement ===
Social media engagement measures how people connect with advertisers' social media accounts and content. It covers a range of behaviours, among them 'likes', marking an item as a 'favourite', commenting on content, direct messages, replying to other people's comments, sharing existing content such as reposts on X, saves, clicks, and mentions. Engagement is context- and platform-specific, and the experiences associated with evaluations of advertising vary between platforms.

=== Analytics ===
Analytics cover the measurement of campaign performance, such as the number of people reached on a platform or the number of mentions a brand received in a given month. Business accounts provide tools for tracking and analysing these measures. Quantifiable indicators of engagement include the number of likes, shares, comments, opens, views, followers, and clicks, and these metrics are used to evaluate the performance of digital engagement campaigns.

== Pros and cons ==
Social network advertising is intended to allow advertisers to reach users who are interested in their products. It has also been associated with improved search engine ranking.

For users and consumers, a disadvantage in terms of internet privacy is the widespread use of web tracking techniques. These can serve to measure social media reach, engagement, and conversions, but they also permit the construction of complete personality profiles from advertisement viewing and clicking.

== See also ==
- Social marketing intelligence
- Social media marketing
