= René Veenstra =

Dutch sociologist

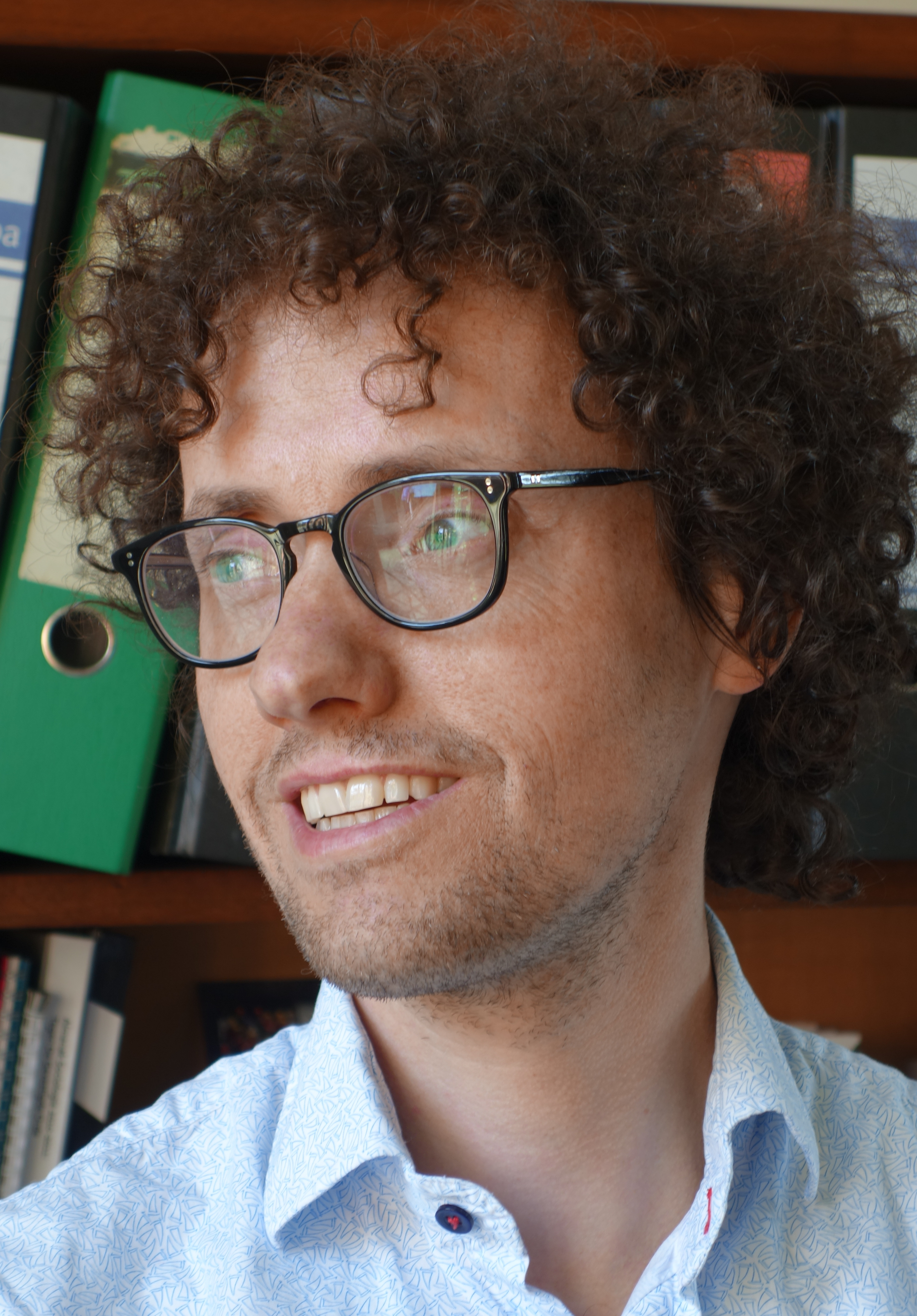
- Born: October 16, 1969 (age 57); Groningen
- Citizenship: Dutch
- Education: University of Groningen
- Known for: Social Network Analysis, Bullying, Peer influence
- Scientific career
- Fields: Sociology
- Workplaces: University of Groningen
- Thesis: Leerlingen – klassen – scholen (1999)
- Doctoral advisor: Jules Peschar, Tom Snijders
- Website: http://www.rene-veenstra.nl

René Veenstra (Groningen, October 16, 1969) is professor of Sociology at the University of Groningen, the Netherlands. He was the scientific director of the Interuniversity Center for Social Science Theory and Methodology (ICS) from 2014 to 2023. The ICS is a joint graduate school of the sociology departments of the University of Groningen, Utrecht University, the Radboud University Nijmegen, and the University of Amsterdam.

== Biography ==
Veenstra graduated in Educational Sciences and Pedagogy from the University of Groningen in 1994. In 1999 he received his doctorate in Sociology of education under the supervision of Jules Peschar and Tom Snijders. From 2000 to 2004, he worked as a postdoctoral researcher (with Siegwart Lindenberg and Hans Ormel) and as a data manager at TRAILS.

In 2011, he was appointed professor of sociology. In 2015, he received a 1.5 million NWO Vici grant for a research program entitled Anti-bullying programs 2.0: Tailored interventions to minimize bullying.

He is a member of the steering committee of the 22 million GUTS (Growing Up Together in Society) research program, funded by the Ministry of Education, Culture, and Science. This 10-year program (2023–2032) was initiated by Eveline Crone. The program aims to understand how young people grow up in a complex society. GUTS combines social network research with neuropsychology.

== Research ==
Veenstra examines and directs research on the social development of youth. This line of research examines, for instance, social norms, social influence, social network processes related to bullying, and the healthy context paradox. He edited a special issue of the Journal of Research on Adolescence on selection and influence processes in adolescent research and a special issue of the International Journal of Behavioral Development on social norms and behavioral development.

His line of research uses various analysis techniques, including social network analysis techniques such as stochastic actor-oriented models, as implemented in RSiena, a program developed by Tom Snijders and colleagues. His group also collected high quality datasets, such as TRAILS, SNARE, KiVa NL, PEAR, and PRIMS.

== TRAILS ==
TRAILS is a cohort study that has been following a group of youth in their development since 2001. Approximately 2,500 young people complete questionnaires, interviews, and tests every two years. TRAILS researchers examine their physical, mental, and social development. Topics that have been studied with TRAILS include bullying and victimization, social withdrawal, acceptance and rejection by parents and peers, and health disparities between heterosexual and LGB adolescents

== SNARE ==
SNARE (Social Network Analysis of Risk behavior in Early adolescence) is a Dutch adolescent social network dataset with about 1,800 students from two schools: one in the middle and one in the north of the Netherlands. Longitudinal social network studies using SNARE focused on how friends select and influence each other in terms of academic achievement, aggression, and helping.

== KiVa NL ==
KiVa NL is a dataset collected to evaluate the KiVa anti-bullying intervention in the Netherlands. KiVa was originally a Finnish program and was developed by Christina Salmivalli. The intervention effectively prevents and combats bullying. KiVa emphasizes the role of the whole group in bullying. Teachers are important for instructing students and breaking the power that bullies have over their classmates. KiVa NL includes 10,000 students from a total of 98 schools. Data collection began in 2012 with a pre-assessment in grades 2-5 and was followed up every six months for two years, resulting in five waves of data. Longitudinal social network studies using KiVa NL have focused on the co-development of bullying and victimization on the one hand, and antipathies, defending, friendships, and popularity on the other.

== PEAR ==
The PEAR (Peers and the Emergence of Adolescent Romance) survey among 2,000 high school students reveals that sexual relationships follow a long-chain pattern, shaped by a key social norm: young people avoid dating a friend's ex. Sexually active girls are more likely to lose friendships and face peer rejection, whereas this effect is absent for boys. However, both boys and girls gain popularity as they become more sexually active, highlighting a double standard in friendships but not in popularity.

PEAR has also been used to examine how friendships influence homophobic attitudes. Heterosexual youth with LGBTQ friends report lower levels of homophobia, but gender plays a stronger role (girls are twice as likely as boys to have LGBTQ friends) than the friendships themselves, contradicting the contact hypothesis.

== Recognition ==
Veenstra was a visiting professor at the Department of Psychology at the University of Turku, Finland (2007-2012). He is associate editor of Merrill-Palmer Quarterly. He served as an editor of the Journal of Research on Adolescence from 2010 to 2016. Veenstra was elected member of the Royal Netherlands Academy of Arts and Sciences in 2024. He is a member of the Royal Holland Society of Sciences and Humanities and an elected fellow of the International Society for the Study of Behavioral Development. He delivered keynote addresses at the 2nd World Anti-Bullying Forum and the 27th meeting of the International Society for the Study of Behavioral Development. He was the keynote speaker at the opening of the academic year 2022 in Groningen in the Martini Church.
