= Merrill-Palmer Quarterly =

- Discipline: Peer Relations
- Language: English
- Edited by: Brett Laursen

Publication details
- History: 1954-present
- Publisher: Wayne State University Press
- Frequency: Quarterly
- Impact factor: 1.2 (2023)

Standard abbreviations
- ISO 4: Merrill-Palmer Q.

Indexing
- CODEN: MPQUA5
- ISSN: 0272-930X (print); 1535-0266 (web)
- LCCN: sn91028419
- OCLC no.: 811778484

Links
- Journal homepage

The Merrill-Palmer Quarterly is a peer-reviewed scientific journal. It is the only empirical journal dedicated to the topic of peer relations. Published four times a year, the journal features developmental, quantitative research on peer relationships and interpersonal factors that impact socioemotional development.

== History ==
The journal has a long and rich history as one of the oldest journals in developmental psychology. Originally attached to the Merrill-Palmer Institute in Detroit, the journal was founded in 1954 to promote and disseminate scientific information about child and family development and became a scientific journal in 1960. The Institute was acquired by Wayne State University in 1981 and the journal is now published by Wayne State University Press. From 1958 to 1981, it was known as the Merrill-Palmer Quarterly of Behavior and Development, and from 1981 to 2024 as Merrill-Palmer Quarterly: Journal of Developmental Psychology.

== Editors ==
Since 2025, the editor-in-chief has been Brett Laursen (Florida Atlantic University), and the journal is now known as Merrill-Palmer Quarterly: A Peer Relations Journal. The associate editors are Hannah Schacter, René Veenstra, and Melanie Zimmer-Gembeck. According to the Journal Citation Reports, the journal has a 2023 impact factor of 1.2.

Previous editors were Ralph E. Sloan (1954-1959), Martin L. Hoffman (1960-1980), Grover Whitehurst (1980), Eli Saltz (1981-1982), Carolyn Uhlinger Shantz (1982-2000), and Gary W. Ladd (2001-2024).

== Focus ==
Most papers published in the journal address a core themes in peer relations: (a) features (what peers do with each other), (b) effects (antecedents and consequences of features), or (c) processes (mechanisms that account for associations within and between features and effects). Topics include peer relations and networks (e.g., friendships, peer groups and networks, romantic relationships, sibling relationships), peer settings (e.g., social media, school, home), peer interactions (e.g., bullying, helping), peer reputation and status (e.g., popularity, acceptance, rejection), and the antecedents, consequences, and correlates of each.

== Most cited articles per decade ==
- Neural Underpinnings of Peer Experiences and Interactions: A Review of Social Neuroscience Research
- What Does It Take to Stand Up for the Victim of Bullying? The Interplay Between Personal and Social Factors
- Person-Centered and Variable-Centered Approaches to Longitudinal Data
- Temperament and Social-Behavior in Childhood
- Continuities and Changes In Children's Social-Status: A 5-Year Longitudinal-Study
- Acquisition of Performatives Prior to Speech
- Sex, Age, and State as Determinants of Mother-Infant Interaction
- Personal Thoughts on Teaching and Learning
