= Net-map toolbox =

Social network analysis tool

The net-map toolbox is a social network analysis tool that uses interviews and mapping to help people understand, visualize, discuss, and improve situations in which many different actors influence outcomes. Social network analysis is a research approach used by scholars such as S.D. Berkowitz, Stephen Borgatti, Ronald Burt, Linton Freeman, Mark Granovetter, Nicholas Mullins, Anatol Rapoport, Stanley Wasserman, Barry Wellman, and Harrison White to better understand the implications of the position of individual actors in a social structure.

Individuals create influence network maps using materials from a physical toolkit. Actor names are written on post-it notes and distributed on a large sheet of paper. Lines are drawn to link the actors and reveal how they are connected or not connected, and “influence towers” are built to reflect the relative power of each actor (the higher the influence tower, the greater the influence). Photos displaying these influence network maps are available on the Net-Map blog.

== History of net-map ==
Net-map was created in 2006 by Eva Schiffer, then a post-doctoral fellow at the International Food Policy Research Institute in Washington, DC. Dr. Schiffer developed the toolbox while working on a project in Ghana with the Challenge Program on Water and Food, a system-wide program of the Consultative Group on International Agricultural Research. Net-Map expands on the Power Mapping Tool. The White Volta River Basin Board in rural Ghana, responsible for overseeing local water resources, was looking to enhance decision making among its many collaborators. The Board used Net-Map to identify its partners, its linkages with those partners, and their distinct goals and levels of influence. A representation of the Board’s network map is available in a World Bank Sourcebook for Development Practitioners. Net-Map was also presented at the International Network of Social Network Analysis' International Sunbelt Social Network Conference in 2007.

Several researchers have made the case for visual network mapping, specifically in improving development projects., a monitoring and evaluation specialist based in the United Kingdom, supports the use of a network perspective in representing and evaluating aid interventions. Boru Douthwaite, a Technology Policy Analyst at the International Center for Tropical Agriculture (CIAT) has used Participatory Impact Pathways Analysis (PIPA), which draws on many of the same concepts as Net-Map, to evaluate and manage development projects by directly engaging the participants. PIPA has been implemented through several workshops across the developing world, and is being developed by Mr. Douthwaite and other researchers from CIAT, as well as the WorldFish Center and the International Potato Center. The New Tactics in Human Rights Project—led by a diverse group of human rights international organizations, advisors and practitioners—uses visual network representations as one of its various innovative tools to promote human rights and end human rights abuses.

== Applications ==
Azmiri Mian, Centre for Human Resource Management, University of South Australia Business School, is using Net-Map Toolbox within the Human Resource Management and Organizational Behavior disciplines. Her PhD research is a mixed method case study to illustrate, interpret and explain employee social networks within an Indigenous organization. Ms Mian adapted the Net-Map Toolbox to develop individual Ego maps. This includes who the actors (participants) and alters (connections) are, what kind of a relationship it is, what factors contribute to the development of the network structure and who influences outcomes within the organization. Findings from this PhD study will become available on the Net-Map blog.

Net-Map has also been applied directly, with the results documented in case studies, also available on the Net-Map blog. A research project on fisheries management in small reservoirs in Ghana, conducted by Ph.D. student Jennifer Hauck through the University of Bonn’s Center for Development Research (ZEF), focused on understanding networks on an individual actor level. Ms. Hauck adapted the Net-Map Toolbox by using local parts purchased in Ghana, including spare bicycle parts, reflecting Net-Map’s versatility.

The International Fund for Agricultural Development (IFAD) funded the rehabilitation of small reservoirs in Northern Ghana, but IFAD also wanted to understand the governance aspects of small reservoir maintenance so that local institutions could manage and maintain the infrastructure. A collaborative project between IFAD, IFPRI, and the University of Bonn, used Net-Map to understand the role of Water User Associations, formed under the IFAD project, and other actors in local natural resources governance networks in Northern Ghana.

The International Food Policy Research Institute has used Net-Map in numerous cases, e.g. to understand the links between research and policy making in Nigeria and Malawi, to improve the effectiveness of an HIV/Aids and Nutrition Network in Africa, to improve communication and implementation concerning pro-poor avian influenza mitigation, eg. in Ghana and Ethiopia.

The * World Bank uses Net-Map as part of its Leadership for Development program to support reform teams in developing countries in mastering the adaptive challenges of implementing reforms.

== Awards ==
In recognition of Eva Schiffer's development of the Net-Map Toolbox, she was awarded the 2008 CGIAR Promising Young Scientist Award.

== Bibliography ==
- Schiffer, Eva (2007). "Organizational learning in multi-stakeholder water governance" (PDF). Net-Map Case Study Series. International Food Policy Research Institute: Washington, DC.
- "Tools for Institutional, Political, and Social Analysis of Policy Reform A Sourcebook for Development Practitioners" (PDF). The World Bank: Washington, DC. 2007.
- Davies, Rick (2003). "Network Perspectives In The Evaluation Of Development Interventions: More Than A Metaphor" (PDF). New Directions in Impact Assessment for Development: Methods and Practice: EDAIS Conference November 24–25, 2003. Archived from the original (PDF) on 2008-05-16.
- Hauck, Jennifer. (2007) "Research on Fisheries Management in Small Multipurpose Reservoirs." Net-Map Case Study Series. International Food Policy Research Institute: Washington, DC.
- Schiffer, Eva; J. Hauck; and M. Abukari. (2007) "Influence Network Mapping: Mapping linkages of Water Users’ Associations in IFAD-supported LACOSREP in Northern Ghana." International Food Policy Research Institute: Washington, DC.
