= Netocracy =

Global upper-class that bases its power on a technological advantage

Netocracy was a term invented by the editorial board of the American technology magazine Wired in the early 1990s. A portmanteau of Internet and aristocracy, netocracy refers to a perceived global upper-class that bases its power on a technological advantage and networking skills, in comparison to what is portrayed as a bourgeoisie of a gradually diminishing importance.

The concept was later picked up and redefined by Alexander Bard and Jan Söderqvist for their book Netocracy — The New Power Elite and Life After Capitalism (originally published in Swedish in 2000 as Nätokraterna : boken om det elektroniska klassamhället, published in English by Reuters/Pearsall UK in 2002).

The netocracy concept has been compared with Richard Florida's concept of the creative class. Bard and Söderqvist have also defined an underclass in opposition to the netocracy, which they refer to as the consumtariat.

== Consumtariat ==
Alexander Bard describes a new underclass called the consumtariat, a portmanteau of consumer and proletariat, whose main activity is consumption, regulated from above. It is kept occupied with private problems, its desires provoked with the use of advertisements and its active participation is limited to things like product choice, product customization, engaging with interactive products and life-style choice.

== Cyberdeutocracy ==
Similar to netocracy is the concept of cyberdeutocracy. Karl W. Deutsch in his book The Nerves of Government: Models of Political Communication and Control hypothesized about "information elites, controlling means of mass communication and, accordingly, power institutions, the functioning of which is based on the use of information in their activities." Thus Deutsch introduced the concept of deutocracy, combining the words 'Deutsch' and 'autocracy' to get the new term. Cyberdeutocracy combines 'deutocracy' with the prefix 'cyber-' and is defined as a political regime based on the control by the political and corporate elites of the information and communication infrastructure of the Internet space. As a tool of social control, cyberdeutocracy allows elites to engage in the:

- destruction and/or transformation of existing meanings, symbols, values, and ideas
- generation of new meanings, symbols, values, and ideas
- introduction of these transformed and new meanings, symbols, values, and ideas into the public consciousness to shape society's perception of political reality.

The term was coined by Phillip Freiberg in his 2018 paper "What are CyberSimulacra and Cyberdeutocracy?"

== Other usages ==
Netocracy can also refer to "Internet-enabled democracy" where issue-based politics will supersede party-based politics. In this sense, the word netocracy is also used as a portmanteau of Internet and democracy, not of Internet and aristocracy:

- "In Seattle, organized labor ran interference for the ragtag groups assembled behind it, marshaling several thousand union members who feared that free trade might send their jobs abroad. In Washington, labor focused on lobbying Congress over the China-trade issue, leaving the IMF and the World Bank to the ad hoc Netocracy."
- "From his bungalow in Berkeley, he's spreading the word of grassroots netocracy to the Beltway. He formed an Internet political consulting firm with Jerome ..."

== See also ==
- 1% rule (Internet culture)
- Algocracy
- Digital citizen
- Digital divide
- Group decision-making
- Indigo Era (economics)
- Influencer marketing
- Information ecology
- Information society
- Knowledge divide
- Power user
- Social marketing intelligence § Alpha users
- Uberisation
