= Network-based diffusion analysis =

Network-based diffusion analysis (NBDA) is a statistical tool to detect and quantify social transmission of information or a behaviour in social networks (SNA, etc.). NBDA assumes that social transmission of a behavior follows the social network of associations or interactions among individuals, since individuals who spend a lot of time together, or who interact more have more opportunity to learn from each other. Therefore, NBDA infers social transmission if the spread of a novel behavior follows the social network of a population. NBDA thus allows the study of social learning to be linked to animal behavior research that uses social network analysis. NBDA was introduced by Franz & Nunn and further developed by Hoppitt, Boogert, & Laland. An R package for performing Bayesian NBDA, STbayes, was published by Chimento & Hoppitt in 2025.

== Implementation ==
NBDA requires prior knowledge about the underlying social network of a population. In an observational study, the order (or timing) at which individuals in the population acquire a behaviour or information is recorded. NBDA then tests whether the spread of information or behaviour is explained by the previously determined network or not. Because more closely associated individuals are more likely to interact with each other, information is assumed to travel along social ties. If there is a good match between the diffusion of information and the underlying network social transmission is assumed. Otherwise, it is assumed that information was asocially acquired (e.g. trial and error, mistakes, etc.).

== Application ==
NBDA does not only serve as a tool for the detection of social learning, but also allows the estimation of the strength of the social transmission effect. In addition, several individual-level variables can be included in the analysis, which have potential influence on an individual's learning rate (e.g. gender, rank or age), and can also be used to model the effect of, and statistically control for potential ecological and genetic influences. NBDA has been successfully used in a number of studies to identify and quantify the effects of social transmission on the spread of behaviors in both wild and captive animal populations such as starlings, chimpanzees or humpback whales.

== Examples ==
- Lobtail-feeding in humpback whales
- Foraging strategies in tits
- Moss-sponging in chimpanzees
