= Rainer K. Silbereisen =

German psychologist

- Born: 24 August 1944 (age 81); Freudenstadt, Germany
- Education: Technische Universität Berlin
- Known for: Human development
- Spouse: Yes
- Awards: Franz-Emanuel-Weinert Award from the German Psychological Society (2010)
- Scientific career
- Fields: Developmental psychology
- Institutions: University of Jena
- Website: www.rainersilbereisen.de

Rainer K. Silbereisen (born 24 August 1944) is a German psychologist who serves as research professor of Developmental Psychology at the University of Jena, where he is also Director of the Center for Applied Developmental Science. He is a fellow of the American Psychological Association and the Association for Psychological Science, as well as a member of Academia Europaea. He has served as president of the German Psychological Society, the International Society for the Study of Behavioural Development, and the International Union of Psychological Science. He has also served as editor-in-chief of the International Journal of Behavioral Development, European Psychologist, and the International Journal of Psychology.
