= Martin Hoffman =

American psychologist

Martin L. Hoffman was an American psychologist and professor emeritus of developmental psychology at New York University.

In his career, Hoffman is primarily focused on development of empathy and its relationship with moral development, which he defines as "people's consideration for others." His research also touches on areas such as empathic anger, sympathy, guilt and feelings of injustice.

Hoffman did his undergraduate studies at Purdue University, receiving a B.S. in electrical engineering in 1945. He earned a master's degree in psychology at the University of Michigan in 1947 and a PhD in social psychology at the University of Michigan in 1951. In the 1960s, he became editor of the Merrill-Palmer Quarterly, and oversaw its conversion from a newsletter to an academic journal.

He is a fellow of the American Association for the Advancement of Science, the American Psychological Association, and the American Psychological Society.

== Books ==
- Hoffman, Martin L. (2000). Empathy and Moral Development: Implications for Caring and Justice. Cambridge: Cambridge University Press. doi:10.1017/CBO9780511805851. ISBN 9780511805851.
