= Gary W. Ladd =

American psychologist (born 1950)

- Born: April 28, 1950 (age 75)
- Education: Grove City College; Alfred University; University of Rochester
- Awards: Center for Advanced Study in the Behavioral Sciences Fellow (1997–98)
- Scientific career
- Fields: Psychology
- Institutions: Arizona State University
- Thesis: Social skills and peer acceptance: the effects of a social learning method for training verbal social skills (1979)

Gary W. Ladd (born April 28, 1950) is the Cowden Distinguished Professor in the T. Denny Sanford School of Social and Family Dynamics and the Department of Psychology at Arizona State University. He is also the editor-in-chief of Merrill-Palmer Quarterly. He is known for his research on the prevalence and adverse effects of bullying on schoolchildren.
