= Wendy Dant Chesser =

American politician

Member of the Indiana House of Representatives from the 71st district
- Incumbent
- Assumed office June 4, 2024
- Preceded by: Rita Fleming

Personal details
- Party: Democratic
- Education: Indiana University Southeast (BS)

Wendy Dant Chesser is a Democratic member of the Indiana House of Representatives representing District 71.

She attended Indiana University Southeast. Dant Chesser is the chief director of corporate strategy and external affairs at the River Ridge Development Authority.

In 2024, she replaced Rita Fleming in the Indiana House of Representatives and as the Democratic nominee for House District 71. Chesser would go on to defeat Scott Hawkins in the 2024 General Election.

== Electoral history ==
Indiana State House District 71 election, 2024
Party	Candidate	Votes	%	±%
Democratic	Wendy Dant Chesser (incumbent)	13,295	49.9%	−0.7
Republican	Scott Hawkins	12,326	46.3%	−3.1%
Libertarian	Gregory Hertzsch	1,015	3.8%	+3.8%
Total votes		26,636	100.00%	
