= Journal of Research on Adolescence =

- Discipline: Developmental psychology
- Language: English
- Edited by: Amanda Sheffield Morris

Publication details
- History: 1991-present
- Publisher: Wiley-Blackwell on behalf of the Society for Research on Adolescence
- Frequency: Quarterly
- Open access: Hybrid
- Impact factor: 4.6 (2023)

Standard abbreviations
- ISO 4: J. Res. Adolesc.

Indexing
- ISSN: 1050-8392 (print); 1532-7795 (web)
- LCCN: 91643986
- OCLC no.: 21653571

Links
- Journal homepage; Online access; Online archive

Journal of Research on Adolescence is a peer-reviewed academic journal published quarterly by Wiley-Blackwell on behalf of the Society for Research on Adolescence. The journal covers research on adolescence using both quantitative and qualitative methodologies applied to cognitive, physical, emotional, and social development and behavior.

According to the Journal Citation Reports, the journal has a 2023 impact factor of 4.6, ranking it 2nd out of 66 journals in the category "Family Studies" and 12th out of 91 journals in the category "Psychology, Developmental".

== Editors ==
The editor-in-chief is Su Yeong Kim (University of Texas at Austin). Previous (associate) editors of the journal included Jacquelynne Eccles, Stephen T. Russell, Nancy Guerra, René Veenstra, Sandra Graham, Noel A. Card, and Amanda Sheffield Morris.

== Most cited articles per decade ==
- Toward Understanding the Functions of Peer Influence: A Summary and Synthesis of Recent Empirical Research
- Dynamics of Identity Development in Adolescence: A Decade in Review
- Evidence of Diverse Identities in a Large National Sample of Sexual and Gender Minority Adolescents
- Beyond Homophily: A Decade of Advances in Understanding Peer Influence Processes
- Schools as Developmental Contexts During Adolescence
- A Reinterpretation of Parental Monitoring in Longitudinal Perspective
- Racial Identity Matters: The Relationship between Racial Discrimination and Psychological Functioning in African American Adolescents
- More Than Myth: The Developmental Significance of Romantic Relationships during Adolescence
- We Know Some Things: Parent-Adolescent Relationships in Retrospect and Prospect
- Adolescents' Perceptions of Middle School: Relation to Longitudinal Changes in Academic and Psychological Adjustment
- Variations in Bicultural Identification among African American and Mexican American Adolescents
- Parental Ethnic Socialization and Adolescent Coping With Problems Related to Ethnicity.

== Special issues ==
- Black Lives Matter!: Systems of Oppression Affecting Black Youth
- The Impact of the COVID-19 Pandemic on Adolescent Emotional, Social, and Academic Adjustment
- A Decade Review of Adolescence Research, both in 2011 and 2021
- Parenting Adolescents in an Increasingly Diverse World
- Adolescents in the Majority World, both in 2013 and 2024
- Network and Behavior Dynamics in Adolescence
- Moral Development in Adolescence
- Affective Processes in Adolescence
