= Constance Flanagan =

- Other names: Connie
- Occupation: Professor
- Known for: Civic education research

Constance A. Flanagan is the University of Wisconsin–Madison School of Human Ecology Vaughan Bascom Professor in Women, Family and Community.
