= Anne C. Petersen =

American psychologist

Anne Cheryl Petersen
- Born: September 11, 1944 (age 81); Little Falls, Minnesota
- Education: University of Chicago
- Occupation: Psychologist

Anne Cheryl Petersen (born September 11, 1944) is an American developmental scientist. She served as dean of the College of Health and Human Development at Pennsylvania State University, deputy director and chief operating officer of the National Science Foundation, and vice-president of programs at the W. K. Kellogg Foundation. She is one of the founders of the Association for Psychological Science. In 2000, she was listed as one of the most influential psychologists by the Encyclopedia of Psychology. Her research has focused primarily on adolescent development and gender issues.

== Early life and education ==
Petersen was born in Little Falls, Minnesota on September 11, 1944, to Rhoda Pauline Sandwick Studley and Franklin Hanks Studley. Her mother was a secretary and her father was a coach and a teacher.

Petersen studied as an undergraduate at the University of Chicago, receiving a B.A. in mathematics in 1966, a M.S. in statistics in 1972, and a Ph.D. in measurement, evaluation, and statistical analysis in 1973.

== Career ==
Petersen has published over 350 articles and 18 books in the areas of adolescent health and development, gender issues, science policy, and global issues. Her research focused on adolescent pubertal development, including the development and publication of the Pubertal Development Scale (PDS) for young adolescents.

Petersen was a professor and chair of the Department of Human Development and Family Studies at Pennsylvania State University from August 1982 to March 1992. On July 1, 1987, she became the first dean of the College of Health and Human Development at Penn State. In 1991, she was named first vice-president for research and dean of the graduate school at the University of Minnesota. She was also full professor at the Institute of Child Development from May 1992 to March 1995. From July, 1994 to September, 1996 she was the deputy director of the National Science Foundation.

Petersen was senior vice president in charge of programming at the W. K. Kellogg Foundation from 1996 to 2005, where she was responsible for United States, Latin American, and southern African programs. Following her work with the Kellogg Foundation, Petersen founded the non-profit foundation Global Philanthropy Alliance (GPA), which funds "early stage youth-led entrepreneur organizations in Africa." From August 2006 to June 2009, Petersen was a deputy director and professor at the Center for Advanced Study in the Behavioral Sciences at Stanford University. In 2010, she became a research professor at the University of Michigan. From January 2010 to the present, Petersen has been at the Center for Human Growth and Development at the University of Michigan. She is also a faculty affiliate of the Science, Technology, and Public Policy (STPP) program at the Gerald R. Ford School of Public Policy.

== Selected works ==
- Witting, M. A., & Petersen, A. C. (1979). Sex-Related Differences in Cognitive Functioning: Developmental Issues. New York: Academic Press.
- Brooks-Gunn, J., & Petersen, A. C. (1983). Girls at Puberty: Biological and Psychosocial Perspectives. New York: Plenum Press.
- Lerner, R. M., Petersen, A. C., & Brooks-Gunn, J. (1991). Encyclopedia of Adolescence. New York: Garland.
- Petersen, A. C., & Mortimer, J. T. (2006). Youth Unemployment and Society. Cambridge: Cambridge University Press.
- Millstein, S. G., Petersen, A. C., & Nightingale, E. O. (2007). Promoting the Health of Adolescents: New Directions for the Twenty-first Century. New York: Oxford University Press.
- Gibson, K. R., & Petersen, A. C. (2011). Brain Maturation and Cognitive Development: Comparative and Cross-cultural Perspectives. New Brunswick: Transaction.
- Petersen, A. C., Joseph, J., & Feit, M. N. (2014). New Directions in Child Abuse and Neglect Research. Washington, D.C.: National Academies Press.
- Graber, J. A., Brooks-Gunn, J., & Petersen, A. C. (2016). Transitions through Adolescence: Interpersonal Domains and Context. London: Routledge.

== Honors ==
- Fellow of the American Association for the Advancement of Science (AAAS)
- Elected to the National Academy of Medicine (NASEM)
- Fellow of the American Psychological Association (APA)
- Fellow of the International Society for the Study of Behavioural Development (ISSBD)
- Chair of the National Academies of Sciences, Engineering, and Medicine's Policy and Global Affairs Divisional Committee
- Founding fellow of the Association for Psychological Science (APS)
- Co-founder of the Society for Research on Adolescence (SRA)
