= Christina Salmivalli =

Finnish psychologist, professor (b. 1967)

- Born: 18 September 1967 (age 59)

Academic background
- Education: University of Turku

Academic work
- Discipline: Psychology
- Sub-discipline: Educational psychology Developmental psychology
- Institutions: University of Turku

Christina Salmivalli (born 18 September 1967) is a Finnish professor of psychology and the deputy head of the INVEST research flagship at the University of Turku in Finland. Salmivalli is recognized as an expert on peer relations and school bullying.

== Biography ==
In 1992, Salmivalli completed a master's degree in psychology from the University of Turku. She earned her doctoral degree in psychology from the University of Turku in 1998. Her research, on social and personality factors of school bullying, won the Finnish Academy of Science and Letters doctoral dissertation award in 1999.

Salmivalli joined the psychology faculty at the University of Turku as an adjunct professor in 2001, becoming a full professor of psychology in 2004. She has held several visiting professorships, including positions at the University of Stavanger in Norway; at Edith Cowan University in Perth, Australia; and at Shandong Normal University in Jinan, China.

In 2020, amid the COVID-19 pandemic in Finland, the Prime Minister's office appointed Salmivalli to lead a 13-member science panel to advise on efforts to mitigate the long-term effects of the pandemic.

== Research ==
Salmivalli conducts research within the fields of developmental psychology and prevention research, focusing on children's and adolescent's peer relations and evidence-based interventions to prevent peer adversities such as school bullying. She has published widely on the role of the peer group in bullying and on interventions aiming to change the peer dynamics contributing to bullying.

=== KiVa ===
In 2006, Salmivalli began leading a team of researchers tasked by Finland's Ministry of Education and Culture to develop and evaluate a bullying intervention program. The resulting program, named KiVa (short for "kiusaamista vastaan", Finnish for "against bullying"), includes lessons on emotions, healthy relationships, and bystander responses to bullying. The program also outlines a specific protocol for school staff to follow when they encounter incidents of bullying.

KiVa is Finland's national bullying prevention program; as of 2016, it had been implemented in over 2,300 Finnish schools. It is also used at schools in more than countries around the world, including the Netherlands, Chile, Italy, the United Kingdom.

KiVa's effectiveness has been evaluated in a number of longitudinal studies. One study of more than 7,000 Finnish students found significant improvements among students' bullying and mental health at schools involved in KiVa, compared to control schools. A large-scale replication in the Netherlands, led by Gijs Huitsing and René Veenstra, found also evidence of the effectiveness of the KiVa program.

== Awards and honours ==
Salmivalli was named Psychologist of the Year by the Finnish Psychological Association in 2009. In 2017, the Minister of Education and Culture, Sanni Grahn-Laasonen, presented Salmivalli with the Finnish Science Prize, worth €100,000. In 2021, Salmivalli was awarded with the William Thierry Preyer Award for Excellence in Research on Human Development by European Association of Developmental Psychology. In 2024, she received the ISSBD (International Society for the Study of Behavioral Development) Award for Distinguished Contributions to the International Advancement of Research and Theory in Behavioural Development.

== Selected works ==
- Salmivalli, Christina; Lagerspetz, Kirsti; Björkqvist, Kaj; Österman, Karin; Kaukiainen, Ari (1998). "Bullying as a group process: Participant roles and their relations to social status within the group". Aggressive Behavior. 22 (1): 1–15. doi:10.1002/(SICI)1098-2337(1996)22:1<1::AID-AB1>3.0.CO;2-T. ISSN 0096-140X.
- Salmivalli, Christina (1999). "Participant role approach to school bullying: implications for interventions". Journal of Adolescence. 22 (4): 453–459. doi:10.1006/jado.1999.0239. PMID 10469509.
- Salmivalli, Christina; Nieminen, Eija (2002). "Proactive and reactive aggression among school bullies, victims, and bully-victims". Aggressive Behavior. 28 (1): 30–44. doi:10.1002/ab.90004. ISSN 0096-140X.
- Salmivalli, Christina; Voeten, Marinus (2004). "Connections between attitudes, group norms, and behaviour in bullying situations". International Journal of Behavioral Development. 28 (3): 246–258. doi:10.1080/01650250344000488. ISSN 0165-0254. S2CID 145536080.
- Salmivalli, Christina (2010). "Bullying and the peer group: A review". Aggression and Violent Behavior. 15 (2): 112–120. doi:10.1016/j.avb.2009.08.007.
- Kärnä, Antti; Voeten, Marinus; Little, Todd D.; Poskiparta, Elisa; Kaljonen, Anne; Salmivalli, Christina (2011). "A Large-Scale Evaluation of the KiVa Antibullying Program: Grades 4-6: Evaluation of KiVa Antibullying Program". Child Development. 82 (1): 311–330. doi:10.1111/j.1467-8624.2010.01557.x. PMID 21291444.
