= Ruth K. Chao =

American university teacher and psychologist

- Education: University of California, Irvine (BA) University of Notre Dame (MA) University of California, Los Angeles (Ph.D.)
- Occupations: Psychologist, University Professor

Ruth K. Chao is an American psychologist. Her research interests center around the parenting styles and socialization of East Asian immigrant families, especially Chinese families, in the United States and Canada. She is an associate professor in the Psychology Department and the principal investigator for the Multicultural Families and Adolescents Study (MFAS) research project at the University of California, Riverside. She is a board member of the Global Parenting Education Group, a nonprofit organization that focuses on parent education in China and other countries.

== Education ==
She earned a bachelor's degree in psychology from the University of California, Irvine, a master's degree in counseling psychology from the University of Notre Dame, and a Ph.D. in educational psychology from University of California, Los Angeles.

== Career ==
Prior to joining the faculty at the University of California, Riverside in 1997, Chao served as a faculty member at Syracuse University. She is currently an associate professor in the psychology department.

Chao serves on the editorial boards of scholarly journals including Developmental Psychology and the Journal of Research on Adolescence.

Chao is mainly working on the Multicultural Families and Adolescents Study (MFAS) at the moment. This research project is funded by a $1.8 million grant from the National Institutes of Health (NIH/NICHD) awarded to Chao. The longitudinal study incorporates a multi-method design for investigating the consequences of parenting styles among European-American families and Asian-American families (specifically Chinese, Korean, Filipino). The study aims to determine how parental behavior (e.g. control, warmth, involvement) might affect school performance and behavioral and psychological adjustment in adolescents within Southern California high schools.

In her work, Chao has argued for a reconceptualization of Diana Baumrind's identification of three parenting styles (authoritative, authoritarian, and permissive) on the basis that the concepts of authoritative and authoritarian are ethnocentric and do not capture the essential features of parenting in Asian American families. She demonstrated that, although the authoritarian style predicts poor school achievement in European American children, the parenting style predicts excellent school achievement in Chinese American children. Her past research supports that Asian American adolescents act as language brokers for their immigrant parents and build respect for their parents based on the perceived maternal sacrifice.

== Publications (selection) ==
- Chao, R. K. (1994), Beyond Parental Control and Authoritarian Parenting Style: Understanding Chinese Parenting through the Cultural Notion of Training. Child Development, 65: 1111–1119.
- Chao, R.K. (1996), Chinese and European American Mothers' Beliefs about the Role of Parenting in Children's School Success. Journal of Cross-Cultural Psychology, 27: 403–423.
- Chao, R.K. (2000), The Parenting of Immigrant Chinese and European American Mothers: Relations Between Parenting Styles, Socialization Goals, and Parental Practices. Journal of Applied Developmental Psychology, 21(2): 233–248.
- Chao, R. K. (2001), Extending Research on the Consequences of Parenting Style for Chinese Americans and European Americans. Child Development, 72: 1832–1843.
- Shen, Y., Kim, S., Wang, Y., and Chao, R.K. Language Brokering and Adjustment among Chinese and Korean American Adolescents: a Moderated Mediation Model of Perceived Maternal Sacrifice, Respect for the Mother, and Mother-Child Open Communication. Asian American Journal of Psychology, 5(2): 86–95.

== Major works ==
Chao has contributed to two books.

- Hill, N.E. and Chao, R.K. (2009). Families, Schools, and the Adolescent: Connecting Research, Policy, and Practice. New York: Teachers College Press.
- Russell, S., Crockett, L.J., and Chao, R.K. (2010). Asian American Parenting and Parent-Adolescent Relationships. Springer Science & Business Media.
