= Glen Elder (sociologist) =

- Born: Glen Holl Elder, Jr. February 28, 1934 (age 92); Cleveland, Ohio
- Known for: Life course theory

Academic background
- Education: University of North Carolina, Chapel Hill PhD, 1961

Academic work
- Discipline: Sociologist
- Institutions: University of California, Berkeley 1962-1967 Cornell University 1979-1984 University of North Carolina, Chapel Hill 1968-1977, 1984-present
- Website: http://elder.web.unc.edu/

Glen Holl Elder Jr. (born 28 February 1934) is an American sociologist who is the Howard W. Odum Research Professor of Sociology (emeritus), a research professor of psychology and a current professor at the Carolina Population Center at the University of North Carolina at Chapel Hill. His research interests are in social psychology, sociology, demographics and life course research. Elder's major work was Children of the Great Depression: Social Change in Life Experience, in 1974. The American Academy of Arts and Sciences admitted Glen H. Elder in 1988. In 1993, he was honored with the Cooley-Mead Award by the Social Psychology Section of the American Sociological Association. Elder was given honorary doctorates by the University of Bremen in 1999, by the Pennsylvania State University in 2003 and by the Ohio State University in 2005.

== Education ==
Elder was born on February 28, 1934, in Cleveland, Ohio. He received a bachelor's of science from Pennsylvania State University, University Park in 1957, his Master's from Kent State University, Kent, Ohio and a PhD. in sociology and psychology from the University of North Carolina, Chapel Hill in 1961.

== Publications ==
- Giele, J.Z. and Elder, G.H. Jr. (eds.) (1998) Methods of life course research. Qualitative and quantitative approaches. Thousand Oaks: Sage.
- Elder, G.H. (1999) Children of the great depression. Social change in life experience. 25. anniversary print, Boulder: Westview Press.
- Elder, G.H., Conger, R.D. and Park, R.D. (2000) Children of the land. Adversity and success in rural America. Chicago: Univ. of Chicago Press.
