= Amanda Sheffield Morris =

American developmental scientist

- Occupations: Developmental scientist, academic, and author

Academic background
- Education: B. A., Psychology; PhD, Developmental psychology
- Alma mater: Southwestern University; Temple University

Amanda Sheffield Morris is an American developmental scientist, known primarily for her work on parenting, emotion regulation, and the neuroscience of adversity and resilience in terms of optimal child and adolescent development. She is currently the Regents Professor of Psychology at Oklahoma State University.

Morris has focused her research on socio-emotional development, parenting, early life adversity, and risk and resilience. She is the author/co-author of several books, including Authoritative Parenting, Adverse and Protective Childhood Experiences: A Developmental Perspective, and The Cambridge Handbook of Parenting: Interdisciplinary Research and Application. She is the editor in chief for the Journal of Research on Adolescence and is an associate editor for the journal Adversity and Resilience Science: Research and Practice.

== Education ==
Morris graduated from Southwestern University in 1995 with a bachelor's degree in psychology. She then enrolled at Temple University, and earned her doctoral degree in developmental psychology in 2000. In the following year, she served as a postdoctoral fellow under the supervision of Nancy Eisenberg, at Arizona State University.

== Career ==
Morris started her career with a brief appointment as research assistant in the Department of Psychology at Southwestern University in 1994, and later on, served in this position at Temple University from 1995 till 2000. She joined Arizona State University as postdoctoral research associate in 2000. From 2001 till 2006, she held appointment as assistant professor of psychology at the University of New Orleans. She then came to Oklahoma State University as associate professor of human development and family science in 2006, was promoted to professor in 2012, and became regents professor in the Department of Human Development and Family Science in 2017. After serving in this role, she took a position as regents professor in the Department of Psychology in 2021. She has held the George Kaiser Family Foundation Chair in Child Development since 2016.

== Research ==
Morris has published over 150 papers. Her research covers a broad range of topics in developmental psychology, with a specific focus on social and emotional development in childhood and adolescence. She has worked to explore contextual influences on psychosocial development, and to highlight the role that adverse and protective experiences play in child and adolescent development.

=== Emotion Regulation and Social and Emotional Development ===
Morris proposed strategies to enhance effortful control and school readiness among kindergarten children from primarily low-income families. She argued that children's effortful control, behavior problems in school, and peer relations are directly interlinked with academic adjustment variables at the end of the school year. She introduced tripartite model in 2007, suggesting that parents can influence children's emotion regulation through three mechanisms: children's observation of parents' emotion regulation, emotion-related parenting practices, and the emotional climate of the family. Along with co-authors, she also published papers to describe the relations that exist between family participation in CareerAdvance, an agency which provides opportunities for families to connect with career coaches while recruiting parents of Head Start children into a workforce training program.

In 2021, Morris presented a model focused on highlighting how experiences affect the whole child, the heart and the head, and considers development within context and across domains. Moreover, she discussed contemporary challenges, and the ways that parents can use to promote healthy development of their children. She provided an overview on highly researched topics on parenting and adolescent development, such as the impact of parenting on adolescent peer and romantic relationships; gene-environment interactions in parenting research, the impact of parenting on adolescent brain development; and parents' involvement in adolescents' social media usage.

=== Developmental neuroscience ===
In her studies focused on developmental neuroscience, Morris investigated cross-brain associations between parents and children. She discussed how neurobiological bases of dyadic emotion regulation plays a significant role in the development of psychopathology. She was a co-investigator for the Adolescent Brain Child Development (ABCD) and was part of the Culture and Environment (CE) Workgroup of ABCD that curates measures in terms of families' social and cultural environment. She is of the view that parent–adolescent relationship is important for adolescents' emotion regulation (ER). Having said that, she provided evidence of CBC and explored associations between cross-brain connectivity (CBC), parenting, and adolescent internalizing symptoms. She is an MPI on the Oklahoma site of the HEALthy Brain and Child Development (HBCD), where she provided principles for guiding the selection of early childhood neurodevelopmental risk and resilience measures.

=== Adversity and resilience ===
Morris developed the Protective and Compensatory Experiences measure and framework with Jennifer Hays-Grudo. The framework was intended to investigate the health effects of childhood adversity and the promotion of resilience through positive experiences. Her 2020 book, Adverse and Protective Childhood Experiences: A Developmental Perspective, explores impacts of enduring childhood experiences, and provides evidence-based approaches for protecting children and repairing the enduring negative consequences of (ACEs) they face as adults. In a series of papers published 2021, she explored the role of cumulative protection in the context of understanding resilience, as well as evaluated the associations between ACEs, PACEs, and attitudes towards nurturing and harsh parenting. Furthermore, she proposed a model for understanding the impact of adverse childhood experiences (ACEs) as dynamic biobehavioral adaptations to early life stress in children.

== Awards and honors ==
- 2005 – Early Career Achievement Award for Excellence in Research, University of New Orleans
- 2004–2007 – Head Start Graduate Student Research Scholar Mentor
- 2009 – Featured researcher, article in Vanguard: Research, Scholarship and Creative Activity at Oklahoma State University
- 2012 – Selected for 40 Under 40 Class of 2012, "movers and shakers that make Oklahoma a more exciting place to live" – featured in Oklahoma Magazine
- 2012 – Featured researcher, article in State Magazine, the official magazine of Oklahoma State University
- 2013 – Regents Distinguished Research Award – In recognition of research excellence, Oklahoma State University
- 2013–2016 – Bryan Close Endowed Professorship
- 2015 – Featured researcher, article in Vanguard: Research, Scholarship and Creative Activity at Oklahoma State University
- 2015 – Regents Distinguished Teaching Award – In recognition of teaching excellence, Oklahoma State University
- 2016 –2021 – George Kaiser Family Foundation Chair in Child Development
- 2018 – Regents Distinguished Research Award – In recognition of research excellence, Oklahoma State University
- 2020 – Featured researcher, article in Vanguard: Research, Scholarship and Creative Activity at Oklahoma State University
- 2021 – George Kaiser Family Foundation Chair Developmental Neuroscience

== Bibliography ==
=== Books ===
- Authoritative Parenting: Synthesizing Nurturance and Discipline for Optimal Child Development (2013) ISBN 9781433812408
- Building Early Social and Emotional Relationships with Infants and Toddlers: Integrating Research and Practice (2019) ISBN 9783030031107
- Adverse and Protective Childhood Experiences: A Developmental Perspective (2020) ISBN 9781433832116
- The Cambridge Handbook of Parenting: Interdisciplinary Research and Application (2022) ISBN 9781108835718
- Raising a Resilient Child in a World of Adversity: Effective Parenting for Every Family (2023) ISBN 9781433834080 [with Jennifer Hays-Grudo]

=== Selected articles ===
- Steinberg, L., & Morris, A. S. (2001). Adolescent development. Journal of Cognitive Education and Psychology, 2(1), 55–87.
- Morris, A. S., Silk, J. S., Steinberg, L., Myers, S. S., & Robinson, L. R. (2007). The role of the family context in the development of emotion regulation. Social development, 16(2), 361–388.
- Morris, A. S., Silk, J. S., Morris, M. D., Steinberg, L., Aucoin, K. J., & Keyes, A. W. (2011). The influence of mother–child emotion regulation strategies on children's expression of anger and sadness. Developmental psychology, 47(1), 213.
- Morris, A. S., Robinson, L. R., Hays-Grudo, J., Claussen, A. H., Hartwig, S. A., & Treat, A. E. (2017). Targeting parenting in early childhood: A public health approach to improve outcomes for children living in poverty. Child development, 88(2), 388–397.
- Morris, A. S., Criss, M. M., Silk, J. S., & Houltberg, B. J. (2017). The impact of parenting on emotion regulation during childhood and adolescence. Child Development Perspectives, 11(4), 233–238.
- Ratliff, E. L., Kerr, K. L., Misaki, M., Cosgrove, K. T., Moore, A. J., DeVille, D. C., ... & Morris, A. S. (2021). Into the Unknown: Examining Neural Representations of Parent–Adolescent Interactions. Child Development, 92(6), e1361-e1376.
- Morris, A. S., Hays-Grudo, J., Zapata, M. I., Treat, A., & Kerr, K. L. (2021). Adverse and protective childhood experiences and parenting attitudes: The role of cumulative protection in understanding resilience. Adversity and Resilience Science, 2(3), 181–192.
- Hays-Grudo, J., Morris, A. S., Beasley, L., Ciciolla, L., Shreffler, K., & Croff, J. (2021). Integrating and synthesizing adversity and resilience knowledge and action: The ICARE model. American Psychologist, 76(2), 203.
