= Nancy Guerra =

American psychologist

Academic background
- Education: BA, University of California, Los Angeles; MA, University of California, Santa Barbara; Ed.D, Human Development and Psychology, 1986, Harvard University
- Thesis: The assessment and training of interpersonal problem-solving skills in aggressive and delinquent youth (1986)

Academic work
- Institutions: University of California, Irvine; University of Delaware; University of California, Riverside; University of Michigan; University of Illinois at Chicago

Nancy G. Guerra is an American psychologist. On June 1, 2016, Guerra was appointed the dean of the School of Social Ecology at the University of California, Irvine.

== Early life and education ==
Guerra received her Bachelor of Arts degree from the University of California, Los Angeles in 1973, and her Master's degree from the University of California, Santa Barbara in 1977. She then worked as youth services director in Carpinteria, California, and from 1979 to 1982 worked for a non-profit organisation in Santa Barbara, California. In 1982, she went to Harvard University to study for a doctorate in education, which she completed in 1986.

== Career ==
Upon completing her formal education, Guerra served on the faculty at the University of Michigan and the University of Illinois at Chicago. In 2000, she became an associate professor at the University of California, Riverside and received a three-year grant from the Centers for Disease Control and Prevention to continue research on how to prevent youth violence.

Prior to the 2011–12 academic year, Guerra joined the faculty of the University of Delaware's Department of Psychology from the UC Riverside. During that year, she also served as associate dean for research in the College of Arts and Sciences and director of the Global Research Consortium. In these roles, she briefed the United States Congress on "Raising Healthy Children: Recent Evidence from Developmental Science." The following year, Guerra was appointed associate provost for international programs.

On June 1, 2016, Guerra was appointed the dean of the School of Social Ecology at the University of California, Irvine (UC Irvine).

== Selected publications ==
- Positive Life Changes, Leader's Guide (2009)
