= SON-tests =

Nonverbal intelligence tests

The Snijders-Oomen nonverbal intelligence tests, shortly the SON-tests, are intelligence tests appropriate for children and adults from two and a half to forty years old. The tests are called nonverbal because they can be administered without having to use written or spoken language. The manuals also contain verbal instructions, but the spoken text does not contain extra information compared to the non-verbal instructions. The way the tests are administered is adjusted to the communicative abilities of the subject in order to create a natural test situation. The tests provide an intelligence score that indicates how someone performs in comparison with other persons from the same age.

== HistoryopG ==
The first version of the SON test was developed more than seventy years ago by psychologist Nan Snijders-Oomen, to study the cognitive functioning of deaf children. The goal of this test series was to break the one-sidedness of the non-verbal performance tests of that time and to broaden the functions accessible for non-verbal intelligence research. The first revision of the test was published in 1958 by Dr. Nan Snijders-Oomen and her husband, professor of Psychology Jan Snijders. This test series included norms for both hearing and deaf children. The original SON needed a transition to another type of items for children of about six years. This led to the second revision in 1975 where the test was divided into the SSON for children of seven to seventeen years old and the SON 2.5-7 for children up to seven years old. The next revisions were published under the responsibility of psychologists Peter Tellegen and Jaap Laros from the University of Groningen. The SON-R 5,5-17 was published in 1988. This test replaced the SON-’58 and the SSON. Subsequently, the SON 2.5-7 was revised, which resulted in the publication of the SON-R 2,5-7 in 1998. A short version of this test was published in 2007, the SON-R 2,5-7 [a], which is designed to be administered in non-western countries. Finally, the SON-R 6-40 was published in 2011 as a revision of the SON-R 5,5-17. This test is appropriate for both children and adults.

== Test format ==
=== SON-R 2,5-7 ===
The SON-R 2,5-7 consists of six subtests that contain series of fourteen to seventeen items with increasing difficulty. The testing procedure is adaptive in order to limit the test time and to prevent giving children items that are far beneath or above their level. Entry and stopping rules are used to determine where the test should be started and discontinued. The test administrator provides the test subject with feedback after every item; indicating if an answer is right or wrong and demonstrates the solution to an item if a wrong answer was given. This way, children are given the possibility to learn and correct themselves. The subtests exist of performance and reasoning tests. The performance tests involve producing a solution while working on an item. The reasoning tests are based on discovering relationships between concepts or objects.

- Mosaics This subtest is a spatial visualization test. With this test, children have to copy a certain mosaic pattern with square pieces in a framework.
- Categories This subtest measures abstract reasoning ability. Cards have to be sorted or cards have to be selected on basis of categories.
- Puzzles This is a concrete reasoning test. First, children have to recreate example pictures with puzzle pieces and later on in the test, they have to form pictures on their own without an example.
- Analogies This subtest measures abstract reasoning ability. In the first part of this test, children have to discover the sorting principle of an example and sort pieces according to this principle. In the second part, children have to understand the principle of change of an analogy and solve another analogy via this principle.
- Situations' This subtest is a concrete reasoning test. Here, children are required to complete half-finished drawings by matching the missing parts. The next part consists of choosing the missing parts out of a few alternatives, to create a logically coherent picture.
- Patterns This subtest measures spatial visualization ability. In this subtest, children have to copy certain example patterns.

=== SON-R 6-40 ===
The SON-R 6-40 consists of four subtests containing two or three parallel series of twelve to thirteen items with increasing difficulty. The testing procedure of this test is adaptive, whereby the starting point of a series is decided on basis of the score on the previous series of the subtest. Feedback is limited to informing if one’s answer was right or wrong.

- Analogies This subtest is an abstract reasoning test. Participants have to discover the principle of change of an example analogy where one geometrical figure changes in another geometrical figure, and apply this principle to another comparable figure.
- Mosaics This is a performance test. Mosaic patterns have to be recreated with square pieces in a framework.
- Categories This subtest measures abstract reasoning ability. With this test, participants have to find the common characteristic of three pictures and they have to pick two pictures that also possess this feature.
- Patterns This is a performance test. Here, the missing part of a pattern of lines has to be drawn in.

== Psychometric properties ==
=== Standardization ===
The Dutch standardization research for the SON-R 2,5-7 has been conducted with 1124 children aging 2;3 to 7;3. Also, research was conducted with children with a delay in cognitive development and children with specific handicaps. The standardization research for the SON-R 6-40 has been conducted in the Netherlands and in Germany. The Dutch part of the standardization sample consisted of 938 individuals aging 6 to 40. 50 persons came from special groups that were included in the study. These were adults with light intellectual disabilities and students from special (primary) education. The research was also conducted with 995 German individuals. The total standardization sample consists of 1933 persons. With the SON computer program, all standardized scores are based on the exact age of the participant.

=== Reliability ===
The mean reliability of the subtests of the SON-R 2,5-7 is 0.72 and the reliability of the total IQ score is 0.90. For the SON-R 6-40, the mean reliability of the subtests is 0.87 and the reliability of the total score is 0.95. The reliability and stability of the scores increase as the age of the participants increases.

=== Validity ===
The performance on the SON-R 2,5-7 has been compared with many cognitive tests, like the GOS, WPPSI-R, TONI-2, RAKIT, Bayley, McCarthy, DTVP-2, Peabody, PLS-3, Reynell and the TvK. The mean correlation with these general measures of intelligence was 0.65. For non-verbal measures of intelligence, a mean correlation of 0.65 was found. The mean correlation with verbal development en verbal intelligence was 0.48. Performance on the SON-R 6-40 was compared with the WISC-III/IV, the WAIS-III and the NIO. The mean correlation with these tests was 0.80. The mean correlation for the verbal part was 0.69 and for the performance part it was 0.79. The age of the participant is important for the relation between the SON score and other measures of intelligence; the correlations are generally lower for young children than for older persons.

=== COTAN evaluations ===
The COTAN (the test commission of the Dutch institute for psychologists) evaluates the quality of psychodiagnostic tests available in the Netherlands. Below are the COTAN evaluations for the SON tests.

	SON-R 2,5-7	SON-R 6-40
Premises test construction	good	good
Quality testing materials	good	good
Quality manual	good	good
Norms	good	good
Reliability	good	good
Construct validity	good	6–17 years old good 18–40 years old sufficient¹
Criterion validity	good	good

¹ There is less validation research available for the age group 18-40 years.

== Uses ==
Because of the non-lingualism of the SON-tests, they are especially appropriate for assessing individuals with problems or handicaps in the area of language and speech development and communication and for immigrants who do not speak the language of the test leader fluently, The tests are child friendly because of their adaptive nature and the feedback that participants receive. This makes the test well applicable for assessing children that are hard to test. Each test takes about an hour to administer.

== Translations ==
The SON tests are used in several counties. Since the testing materials do not have to be translated, the test is directly applicable for international and cross-cultural research. Manuals for the tests are published in several languages. For the SON-R 2,5-7, standardization research has been conducted in the Netherlands, Germany, the United Kingdom, France, the Czech Republic, Slovakia and Romania. The SON-R 2,5-7 [a] has been standardized in Brazil and currently a standardization study is being conducted in South-East Asia. For the SON-R 6-40, standardization research has been conducted in the Netherlands, Germany and China.

== Link ==
- www.testresearch.nl
