= Social marketing intelligence =

Social marketing intelligence is the method of extrapolating valuable information from social network interactions and data flows that can enable companies to launch new products and services into the market at greater speed and lower cost. This is an area of research however, companies using social marketing intelligence have achieved significant improvement in marketing campaigns.

Through social marketing intelligence, companies can identify people that are the most influential within their communities. These are the most connected people within any given social network. These people, sometimes called the alpha users or hubs as in small-world network theory, have considerable influence over the spread of information within their social network.

== Alpha users ==
Alpha users are key elements of any social networks, who manage the connectivity of the core members of the community. Similar to how viruses spread in nature, there is an initial starting point to communications in social networks, and the originators of such communications are alpha users. They tend to be highly connected users with exceptional influence to the other thought-leaders of any social network.

Before digital communications, it was only possible to isolate the most influential members of any community by interviewing every member and tracing their full communication patterns within the social network. Traditional fixed landline telephone and internet use did not give enough accuracy to be able to pinpoint alpha users to a meaningful degree. With the advent of mobile phones, a personal digital communication channel was available to study.

Early research by mathematicians at Xtract in Finland produced models that suggested mobile networks could indeed track the full communication and isolate the alpha users. Since then, several companies including Xtract have launched commercial tools to detect alpha users, usually using mobile operator billing and telecoms traffic data.

Engagement marketing campaigns attempt to use alpha users as spokespersons in marketing and advertising. The idea is that consumers will trust more the opinion of their friend or known contact from a social network, than the random marketing and advertising messages of companies and brands. The desire is to achieve viral marketing effects by which the alpha users would spread the messages further.

Alpha users were first briefly discussed in public in the book 3G Marketing in 2004. The first industry article about alpha users was by Ahonen and Ahvenainen in Total Telecom in February 2005. The first telecoms conference where alpha user was explained was the 3G Mobile World Congress in Tokyo in January 2005.

The topic was part of the strategy keynote address at the 3GSM World Congress in Cannes in February 2005. The first book to discuss alpha users at length was Communities Dominate Brands in 2005.

== See also ==
- Engagement marketing
- Influencer marketing
- Marketing intelligence
- Push poll
- Social cloud computing
- Social media
- Social media intelligence
- Social network advertising
- Social network analysis
- Viral marketing
