= Steven R. Stemler =

American politician

Member of the Indiana House of Representatives from the 71st district
- In office 2006–2018
- Preceded by: Dennie R. Oxley Sr.
- Succeeded by: Rita Fleming

Personal details
- Party: Democratic
- Spouse: Vikki
- Occupation: business owner

Steven R. "Steve" Stemler is a former Democratic member of the Indiana House of Representatives. He represented the 71st District from 2006 to 2018. In 2017, Stemler announced that he would not run for reelection to the State House in 2018.
