= Mark Stemmler =

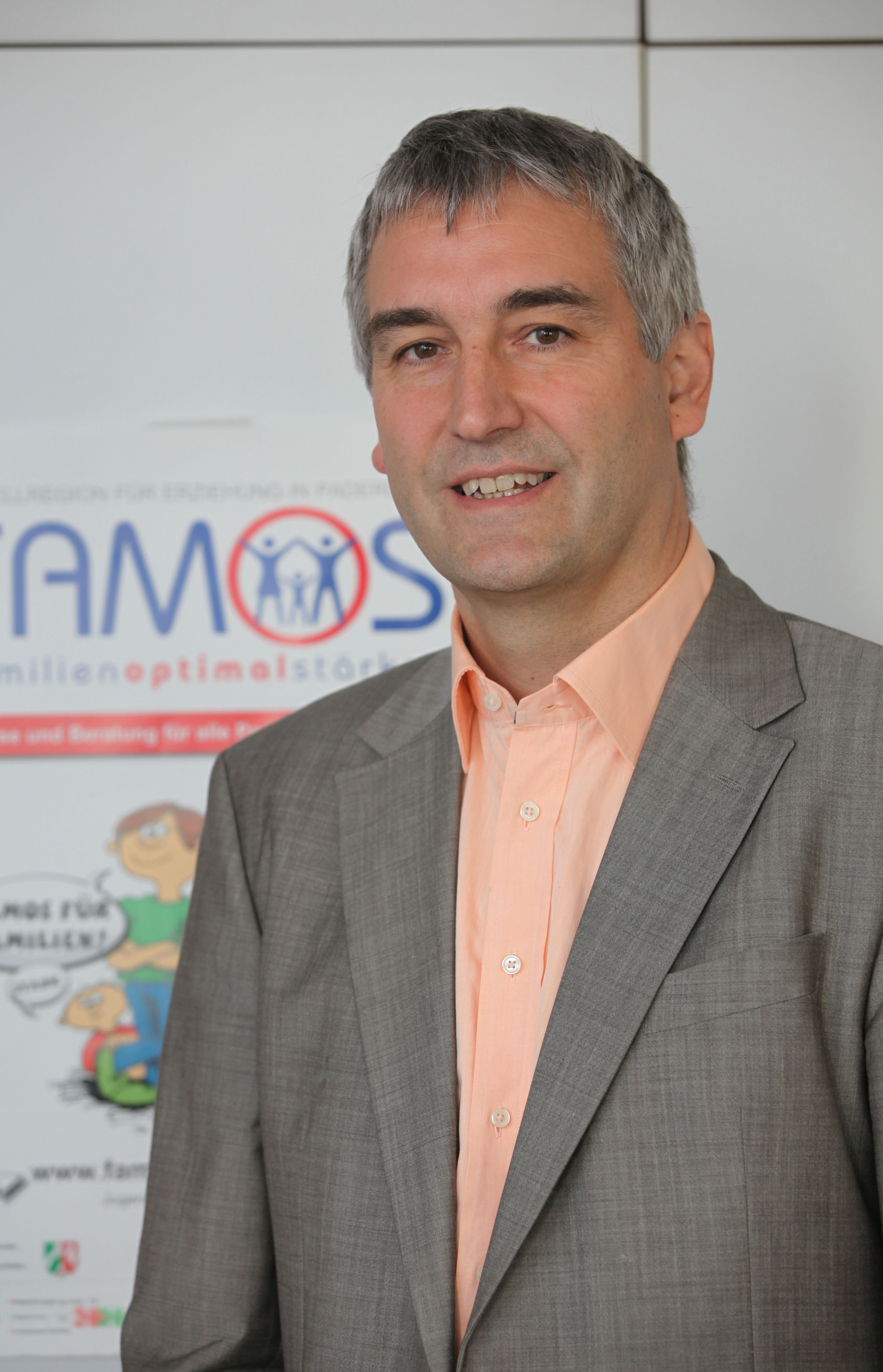
Mark Stemmler in 2011

Mark Stemmler (born August 7, 1960, in Norwood, Massachusetts, United States), was Professor of Psychological Methodology and Quality Assurance at the Faculty of Psychology and Sports Science, Bielefeld University from 2007 to 2011. He was also a member of the Center for Statistics (Zentrum für Statistik) at Bielefeld University. Currently he is Professor of Psychological Assessment at the Department of Psychology and Sports Science at the University of Erlangen-Nuremberg. From 2010 to 2025 he was an adjunct professor at the College of Health and Human Development at the Pennsylvania State University.

== Academia ==
Stemmler was dean of the Faculty of Psychology and Sports Science, Bielefeld University. He is the speaker of the section "Methods and Evaluation" of the German Psychological Society. In his research he combines statistical-methodological and developmental-psychological issues. Thus he cooperated in several psychological longitudinal studies in Germany and the United States. At the University of Erlangen-Nuremberg he coordinated the project “Development and Stimulation of Development”, a combined prevention and longitudinal study financed by the BMFSFJ (Lösel, Beelmann, Jaursch, Koglin, & Stemmler, 2005). He was also responsible for the evaluation and quality assurance of the practical interventions (training of parents and children) of this study. He is a jury member of the MA theses award of the Section Methods and Evaluation at the German Psychological Society (since 2005) and also a member of the academic advisory board of the journal Empirische Sonderpädagogik (since 2009).

== Research ==
- Application for research on Support of parenting and social skills in families: A combined prevention and development study on disorders in social behavior patterns (BMFSFJ)
- Research on the assessment of early cognitive decline in older adults with the SKT. The SKT (acronym for Syndom-Kurztest) according to Hellmut Erzigkeit is a short performance test for the assessment of deficits in memory and attention. The SKT was newly standardized in 2015 and is now much more sensitive and able to identify cognitive deterioration at an early stage. Since 2026 there is also a digital version of the SKT available.
- Extension application to continue and extend the research project Support of parenting and social skills in families (BMFSFJ, 2003–2005)
- During research into Islamist radicalization in European prisons, data that had already been collected were confiscated by German authorities.

== Selected publications ==
- with Schmucker, M. (2025). Inferenzstatistik. Grundriss der Psychologie; Band 29, Stuttgart: Urban - Kohlhammer.
- with Wiedermann, W. & Huang, F. (2024) (Eds.), Dependent Data in Social Sciences Research - Forms, Issues, and Methods of Analysis – Second Edition. Springer: New York.
- 2020. Person-centered methods: Configural Frequency Analysis (CFA) and Other Methods for the Analysis of Contingency Tables (second edition). Series: SpringerBriefs in Statistics: New York: Springer Publishing Company.
- with Kornhuber, J. (2018). Demenzdiagnostik. Kompendien Psychologische Diagnostik – Band 16. Göttingen: Hogrefe Verlag.
- with Heine, J.-H. (2017). Using Configural Frequency Analysis as a Person-Centered Analytic Approach with Categorical Data. International Journal of Behavioural Development, 41(5), 632–646.
- with Reinecke, J. & Wittenberg, J. (2016) (Eds.). Devianz und Delinquenz im Kindes- und Jugendalter. Wiesbaden: Springer VS.
- with von Eye, A. & Wiedermann, W. (2015) (Eds.), Dependent Data in Social Sciences Research - Forms, Issues, and Methods of Analysis. Series Title: Springer Proceedings in Mathematics & Statistics. Springer: New York.
- 2014. Person-centered methods: Configural Frequency Analysis (CFA) and Other Methods for the Analysis of Contingency Tables. Series: SpringerBriefs in Statistics: New York: Springer Publishing Company.
- with A. von Eye. 2012. Special topic: Configural Frequency Analysis (CFA) and other non-parametrical statistical methods – Part I. Psychological Test and Assessment Modeling, Volume 54.
- with T. Bliesener, and A. Beelmann. 2012. Antisocial Behavior and Crime. Cambridge: Hogrefe Publishing.
- with S. Jaursch, F. Lösel, and A. Beelmann. 2009. Inkonsistenz im Erziehungsverhalten zwischen Müttern und Vätern und Verhaltensprobleme des Kindes [Inconsistency in the parenting of mother and father and behavior problems of the child]. Psychologie in Erziehung und Unterricht 56: 172–186.
- with S. Hacker. 2009. Förderung bei externalisierenden Problemen: Aggression [Support in case of externalizing problems: Aggression]. In Psychologische Förder- und Interventionsprogramme für das Kindes- und Jugendalter, eds. A. Lohaus and H. Dombsch, 3–17. Berlin: Springer Verlag.
- with F. Lösel, S. Jaursch, and A. Beelmann. 2009. Universal prevention of antisocial development: Short- and long-term effects of a family-oriented program. Special Issue: Developmental Criminology. Monatsschrift für Kriminologie und Strafrechtsreform.
- with F. Lösel, A. Beelmann, and S. Jaursch. 2008. A Configural Perspective on the Stability of Externalizing Problem Behavior in Children: Results from the Erlangen-Nuremberg Development and Prevention Study. In Configural Frequency Analysis and other Non-Parametrical Methods: A Gustav A. Lienert Memorial Issue, eds. M. Stemmler, E. Lautsch, and D. Martinke, 70–83. Lengerich: Pabst Publishing Company.
- with E. Lautsch, and D. Martinke, eds. 2008. Configural Frequency Analysis and other Non-Parametrical Methods: A Gustav A. Lienert Memorial Issue. Lengerich: Pabst.
- with A. Beelmann, S. Jaursch, and F. Lösel. 2007. Improving the Family Environment to Prevent Child Behavior Problems: A Study on the Parent Training of the EFFEKT Program. International Journal of Hygiene and Environmental Health 210: 563–570.
- with A. Beelmann, F. Lösel, and S. Jaursch. 2007. Zur Entwicklung externalisierender Verhaltensprobleme im Übergang vom Vor- zum Grundschulalter [On the development of externalizing behavior problems at the transition from pre- to elementary school]. Kindheit und Entwicklung 16(4): 229–239.
- with F. Lösel, A. Beelmann, and S. Jaursch. 2006. Prävention von Problemen des Sozialverhaltens im Vorschulalter: Evaluation des Eltern- und Kindertrainings EFFEKT [Prevention of problematic social behavior at pre-school age. Evaluation of the parent-child-training EFFEKT]. Zeitschrift für Klinische Psychologie und Psychotherapie 35(2): 127–139.
- with A. Beelmann, and F. Lösel. 2006. Beurteilung von sozialen Verhaltensproblemen und Erziehungsschwierigkeiten im Vorschulalter [Assessing social behavior problems and parenting difficulties at pre-school age]. Diagnostica 52(4): 189–198.
- with A. C. Petersen. 2005. Gender differential influences of early adolescent risk factors for the development of depressive affect. Journal of Youth and Adolescence 34(3): 175–183.
- with Petersen, A. C., Compas, B., Brooks-Gunn, J., Ey, E. & Grant, K. (1993). Depression in Adolescence. American Psychologist, 48(2), 155-168.
