= International Journal of Behavioral Development =

- Discipline: Developmental psychology
- Language: English
- Edited by: Brett Laursen

Publication details
- History: 1978-present
- Publisher: SAGE Publications
- Frequency: Bimonthly
- Impact factor: 2.015 (2018)

Standard abbreviations
- ISO 4: Int. J. Behav. Dev.

Indexing
- CODEN: IJBDDY
- ISSN: 0165-0254 (print); 1464-0651 (web)
- LCCN: 81642561
- OCLC no.: 300286882

Links
- Journal homepage; Online access; Online archive

The International Journal of Behavioral Development is a peer-reviewed academic journal that covers research in the field of developmental psychology. The journal's current editor-in-chief is Brett Laursen (Florida Atlantic University). It was established in 1978 and is currently published by SAGE Publications on behalf of International Society for the Study of Behavioural Development.

== Abstracting and indexing ==
International Journal of Behavioral Development is abstracted and indexed in Scopus and the Social Sciences Citation Index. According to the Journal Citation Reports, the journal has a 2018 impact factor of 2.015, ranking it 34th out of 74 journals in the category "Psychology, Developmental".
