= Implicit blockmodeling =

Implicit blockmodeling is an approach in blockmodeling, similar to a valued and homogeneity blockmodeling, where initially an additional normalization is used and then while specifying the parameter of the relevant link is replaced by the block maximum.

This approach was first proposed by Batagelj and Ferligoj in 2000, and developed by Aleš Žiberna in 2007/08.

Comparing with homogeneity, the implicit blockmodeling will perform similarly with max-regular equivalence, but slightly worse in other settings. It will perform worse than valued and homogeneity blockmodeling with a pre-specified blockmodel.
