= Aleš Žiberna =

Slovene statistician

Dr. Aleš Žiberna
- Citizenship: Slovenia
- Education: University of Ljubljana
- Scientific career
- Fields: Social network analysis
- Workplaces: University of Ljubljana
- Thesis: Generalized blockmodeling of valued networks = (Posplošeno bločno modeliranje omrežij z vrednostmi na povezavah) (2007)
- Doctoral advisor: Anuška Ferligoj
- Website: FDV

Aleš Žiberna is a Slovene statistician, whose specialty is network analysis. His specific research interests include blockmodeling, multivariate analysis and computer intensive methods (e.g., computer simulations, resampling methods).

Currently, he is employed at the Faculty of Social Sciences of the University of Ljubljana, specifically at the Chair of Social Informatics and Methodology, and Centre for Methodology and Informatics.

== Work ==
In 2007, he proposed a solution to the generalized valued blockmodeling by introducing homogeneity blockmodeling with the basic idea "that the inconsistency of an empirical block with its ideal block can be measured by within block variability of appropriate values". The newly-formed ideal blocks, which are appropriate for blockmodeling of valued networks, are then presented together with the definitions of their block inconsistencies.

He also (in 2007/08) developed an implicit blockmodeling approach, based on previous work of Batagelj and Ferligoj (2000).

In 2014, he proposed a new approach to the blockmodeling - blockmodeling linked networks.

== Selected bibliography ==
- ŽIBERNA, Aleš. Generalized blockmodeling of valued networks. Social Networks. [Print ed.]. Jan. 2007, vol. 29, no. 1, str. 105–126. ISSN 0378-8733.
- ŽIBERNA, Aleš. Blockmodeling of multilevel networks. Social Networks. [Print ed.]. Oct. 2014, vol. 39, str. 46–61, ilustr. ISSN 0378-8733. DOI: 10.1016/j.socnet.2014.04.002. [COBISS.SI-ID 32697949]
- ŽIBERNA, Aleš. Generalized blockmodeling of sparse networks. Metodološki zvezki. [Tiskana izd.]. 2013, vol. 10, no. 2, str. 99–119, graf. prikazi. ISSN 1854-0023. http://www.stat-d.si/mz/mz10.1/Ziberna2013.pdf. [COBISS.SI-ID 32428893]
- MATJAŠIČ, Miha, CUGMAS, Marjan, ŽIBERNA, Aleš. Blockmodeling : an R package for generalized blockmodeling. Metodološki zvezki. [Tiskana izd.]. 2020, vol. 17, no. 2, str. 49–66, ilustr. ISSN 1854-0023. [COBISS.SI-ID 53164547]

== See also ==
- Andrej Mrvar
