= Mathematical sociology =

Interdisciplinary field of research

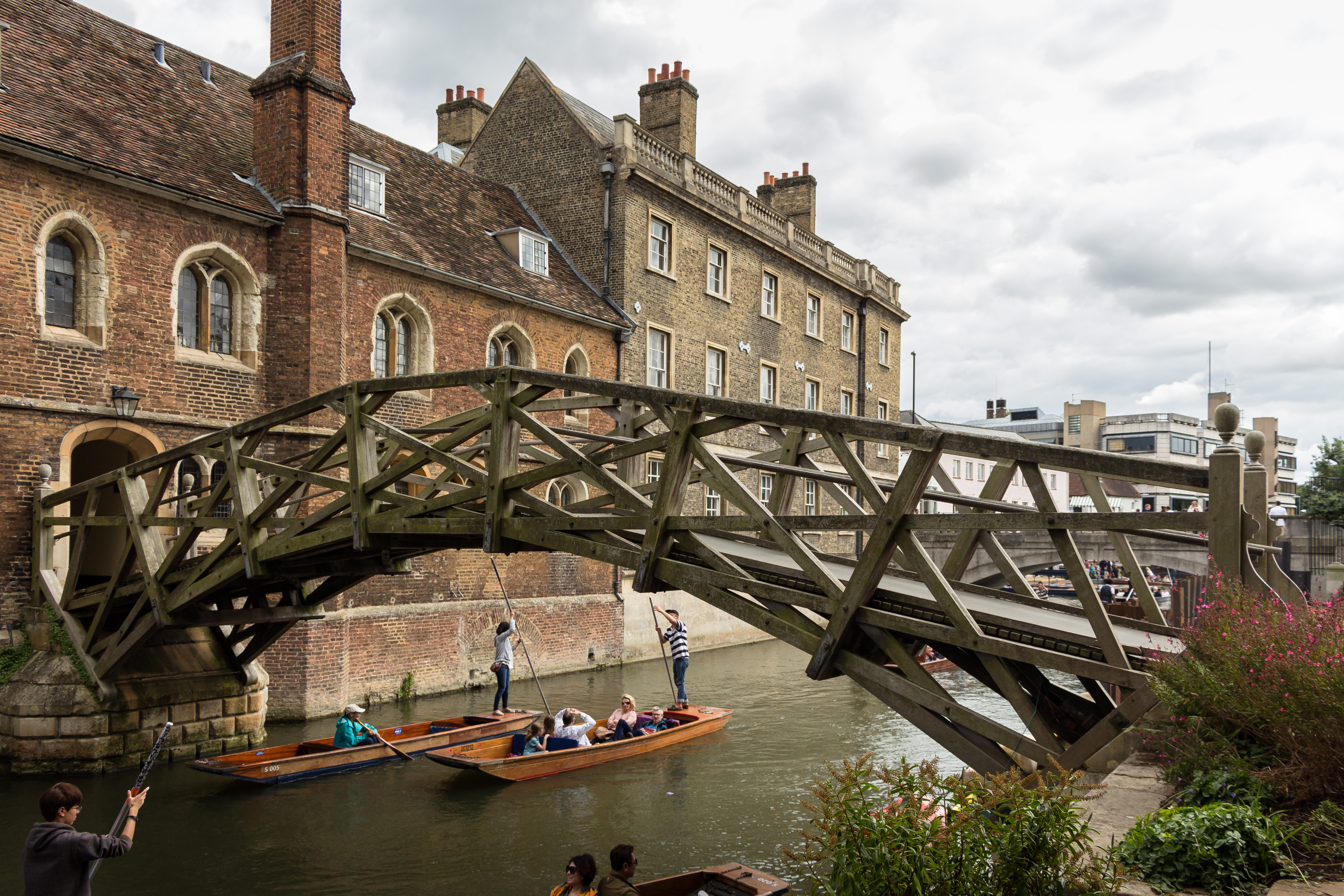
Mathematical Bridge, or officially Wooden Bridge, is an arch bridge in Cambridge, United Kingdom. The arrangement of timbers is a series of tangents that describe the arc of the bridge, with radial members to tie the tangents together and triangulate the structure, making it rigid and self-supporting.

Mathematical sociology is an interdisciplinary field of research concerned with the use of mathematics within sociological research.

== History ==
Starting in the early 1940s, Nicolas Rashevsky, and subsequently in the late 1940s, Anatol Rapoport and others, developed a relational and probabilistic approach to the characterization of large social networks in which the nodes are persons and the links are acquaintanceship. During the late 1940s, formulas were derived that connected local parameters such as closure of contacts – if A is linked to both B and C, then there is a greater than chance probability that B and C are linked to each other – to the global network property of connectivity.

Moreover, acquaintanceship is a positive tie, but what about negative ties such as animosity among persons? To tackle this problem, graph theory, which is the mathematical study of abstract representations of networks of points and lines, can be extended to include these two types of links and thereby to create models that represent both positive and negative sentiment relations, which are represented as signed graphs. A signed graph is called balanced if the product of the signs of all relations in every cycle (links in every graph cycle) is positive. Through formalization by mathematician Frank Harary, this work produced the fundamental theorem of this theory. It says that if a network of interrelated positive and negative ties is balanced, e.g. as illustrated by the psychological principle that "my friend's enemy is my enemy", then it consists of two sub-networks such that each has positive ties among its nodes and there are only negative ties between nodes in distinct sub-networks. The imagery here is of a social system that splits into two cliques. There is, however, a special case where one of the two sub-networks is empty, which might occur in very small networks. In another model, ties have relative strengths. 'Acquaintanceship' can be viewed as a 'weak' tie and 'friendship' is represented as a strong tie. Like its uniform cousin discussed above, there is a concept of closure, called strong triadic closure. A graph satisfies strong triadic closure If A is strongly connected to B, and B is strongly connected to C, then A and C must have a tie (either weak or strong).

In these two developments we have mathematical models bearing upon the analysis of structure. Other early influential developments in mathematical sociology pertained to process. For instance, in 1952 Herbert A. Simon produced a mathematical formalization of a published theory of social groups by constructing a model consisting of a deterministic system of differential equations. A formal study of the system led to theorems about the dynamics and the implied equilibrium states of any group.

The emergence of mathematical models in the social sciences was part of the zeitgeist in the 1940s and 1950s in which a variety of new interdisciplinary scientific innovations occurred, such as information theory, game theory, cybernetics and mathematical model building in the social and behavioral sciences.

== Approaches ==
=== Mathematics in sociology ===
Focusing on mathematics within sociological research, mathematical sociology uses mathematics to construct social theories. Mathematical sociology aims to take sociological theory and to express it in mathematical terms. The benefits of this approach include increased clarity and the ability to use mathematics to derive implications of a theory that cannot be arrived at intuitively. In mathematical sociology, the preferred style is encapsulated in the phrase "constructing a mathematical model." This means making specified assumptions about some social phenomenon, expressing them in formal mathematics, and providing an empirical interpretation for the ideas. It also means deducing properties of the model and comparing these with relevant empirical data. Social network analysis is the best-known contribution of this subfield to sociology as a whole and to the scientific community at large. The models typically used in mathematical sociology allow sociologists to understand how predictable local interactions are and they are often able to elicit global patterns of social structure.

== Further developments ==
In 1954, a critical expository analysis of Rashevsky's social behavior models was written by sociologist James S. Coleman. Rashevsky's models and as well as the model constructed by Simon raise a question: how can one connect such theoretical models to the data of sociology, which often take the form of surveys in which the results are expressed in the form of proportions of people believing or doing something. This suggests deriving the equations from assumptions about the chances of an individual changing state in a small interval of time, a procedure well known in the mathematics of stochastic processes.

Coleman embodied this idea in his 1964 book Introduction to Mathematical Sociology, which showed how stochastic processes in social networks could be analyzed in such a way as to enable testing of the constructed model by comparison with the relevant data. The same idea can and has been applied to processes of change in social relations, an active research theme in the study of social networks, illustrated by an empirical study appearing in the journal Science.

In other work, Coleman employed mathematical ideas drawn from economics, such as general equilibrium theory, to argue that general social theory should begin with a concept of purposive action and, for analytical reasons, approximate such action by the use of rational choice models (Coleman, 1990). This argument is similar to viewpoints expressed by other sociologists in their efforts to use rational choice theory in sociological analysis although such efforts have met with substantive and philosophical criticisms.

Meanwhile, structural analysis of the type indicated earlier received a further extension to social networks based on institutionalized social relations, notably those of kinship. The linkage of mathematics and sociology here involved abstract algebra, in particular, group theory. This, in turn, led to a focus on a data-analytical version of homomorphic reduction of a complex social network (which along with many other techniques is presented in Wasserman and Faust 1994).

In regard to Rapoport's random and biased net theory, his 1961 study of a large sociogram, co-authored with Horvath turned out to become a very influential paper. There was early evidence of this influence. In 1964, Thomas Fararo and a co-author analyzed another large friendship sociogram using a biased net model. Later in the 1960s, Stanley Milgram described the small world problem and undertook a field experiment dealing with it. A highly fertile idea was suggested and applied by Mark Granovetter in which he drew upon Rapoport's 1961 paper to suggest and apply a distinction between weak and strong ties. The key idea was that there was "strength" in weak ties.

Some programs of research in sociology employ experimental methods to study social interaction processes. Joseph Berger and his colleagues initiated such a program in which the central idea is the use of the theoretical concept "expectation state" to construct theoretical models to explain interpersonal processes, e.g., those linking external status in society to differential influence in local group decision-making. Much of this theoretical work is linked to mathematical model building, especially after the late 1970s adoption of a graph theoretic representation of social information processing, as Berger (2000) describes in looking back upon the development of his program of research. In 1962 he and his collaborators explained model building by reference to the goal of the model builder, which could be explication of a concept in a theory, representation of a single recurrent social process, or a broad theory based on a theoretical construct, such as, respectively, the concept of balance in psychological and social structures, the process of conformity in an experimental situation, and stimulus sampling theory.

The generations of mathematical sociologists that followed Rapoport, Simon, Harary, Coleman, White and Berger, including those entering the field in the 1960s such as Thomas Fararo, Philip Bonacich, and Tom Mayer, among others, drew upon their work in a variety of ways.

== Present research ==
Mathematical sociology remains a small subfield within the discipline, but it has succeeded in spawning a number of other subfields which share its goals of formally modeling social life. The foremost of these fields is social network analysis, which has become among the fastest growing areas of sociology in the 21st century. The other major development in the field is the rise of computational sociology, which expands the mathematical toolkit with the use of computer simulations, artificial intelligence and advanced statistical methods. The latter subfield also makes use of the vast new data sets on social activity generated by social interaction on the internet.

One important indicator of the significance of mathematical sociology is that the general interest journals in the field, including such central journals as The American Journal of Sociology and The American Sociological Review, have published mathematical models that became influential in the field at large.

More recent trends in mathematical sociology are evident in contributions to The Journal of Mathematical Sociology (JMS). Several trends stand out: the further development of formal theories that explain experimental data dealing with small group processes, the continuing interest in structural balance as a major mathematical and theoretical idea, the interpenetration of mathematical models oriented to theory and innovative quantitative techniques relating to methodology, the use of computer simulations to study problems in social complexity, interest in micro–macro linkage and the problem of emergence, and ever-increasing research on networks of social relations.

Thus, topics from the earliest days, like balance and network models, continue to be of contemporary interest. The formal techniques employed remain many of the standard and well-known methods of mathematics: differential equations, stochastic processes and game theory. Newer tools like agent-based models used in computer simulation studies are prominently represented. Perennial substantive problems still drive research: social diffusion, social influence, social status origins and consequences, segregation, cooperation, collective action, power, and much more.

== Research programs ==
Many of the developments in mathematical sociology, including formal theory, have exhibited notable decades-long advances that began with path-setting contributions by leading mathematical sociologists and formal theorists. This provides another way of taking note of recent contributions but with an emphasis on continuity with early work through the use of the idea of "research program," which is a coherent series of theoretical and empirical studies based on some fundamental principle or approach. There are more than a few of these programs and what follows is no more than a brief capsule description of leading exemplars of this idea in which there is an emphasis on the originating leadership in each program and its further development over decades.

(1) Rational Choice Theory and James S. Coleman: After his 1964 pioneering Introduction to Mathematical Sociology, Coleman continued to make contributions to social theory and mathematical model building and his 1990 volume, Foundations of Social Theory was the major theoretical work of a career that spanned the period from 1950s to 1990s and included many other research-based contributions. The Foundation book combined accessible examples of how rational choice theory could function in the analysis of such sociological topics as authority, trust, social capital and the norms (in particular, their emergence). In this way, the book showed how rational choice theory could provide an effective basis for making the transition from micro to macro levels of sociological explanation. An important feature of the book is its use of mathematical ideas in generalizing the rational choice model to include interpersonal sentiment relations as modifiers of outcomes and doing so such that the generalized theory captures the original more self-oriented theory as a special case, as point emphasized in a later analysis of the theory. The rationality presupposition of the theory led to debates among sociological theorists. Nevertheless, many sociologists drew upon Coleman's formulation of a general template for micro-macro transition to gain leverage on the continuation of topics central to his and the discipline's explanatory focus on a variety of macrosocial phenomena in which rational choice simplified the micro level in the interest of combining individual actions to account for macro outcomes of social processes.

(2) Structuralism (Formal) and Harrison C. White: In the decades since his earliest contributions, Harrison White has led the field in putting social structural analysis on a mathematical and empirical basis, including the 1970 publication of Chains of Opportunity: System Models of Mobility in Organizations which set out and applied to data a vacancy chain model for mobility in and across organizations. His very influential other work includes the operational concepts of blockmodel and structural equivalence which start from a body of social relational data to produce analytical results using these procedures and concepts. These ideas and methods were developed in collaboration with his former students François Lorraine, Ronald Breiger, and Scott Boorman. These three are among the more than 30 students who earned their doctorates under White in the period 1963-1986. The theory and application of blockmodels has been set out in detail in a recent monograph. White's later contributions include a structuralist approach to markets and, in 1992, a general theoretical framework, later appearing in a revised edition.

(3) Expectation states theory and Joseph Berger: Under Berger's intellectual and organizational leadership, Expectation States Theory branched out into a large number of specific programs of research on specific problems, each treated in terms of the master concept of expectation states. He and his colleague and frequent collaborator Morris Zelditch Jr not only produced work of their own but created a doctoral program at Stanford University that led to an enormous outpouring of research by notable former students, including Murray Webster, David Wagner, and Hamit Fisek. Collaboration with mathematician Robert Z. Norman led to the use of mathematical graph theory as a way of representing and analyzing social information processing in self-other interactions. Berger and Zelditch also advanced work in formal theorizing and mathematical model building as early as 1962 with a collaborative expository analysis of types of models. Berger and Zelditch stimulated advances in other theoretical research programs by providing outlets for the publication of new work, culminating in a 2002 edited volume that includes a chapter that presents an authoritative overview of Expectation states theory as a program of cumulative research dealing with group processes.

(4) Formalization in Theoretical Sociology and Thomas J. Fararo: Many of this sociologist's contributions have been devoted to bringing mathematical thinking into greater contact with sociological theory. He organized a symposium attended by sociological theorists in which formal theorists delivered papers that were subsequently published in 2000. Through collaborations with students and colleagues his own theoretical research program dealt with such topics as macrostructural theory and E-state structuralism (both with former student John Skvoretz), subjective images of stratification (with former student Kenji Kosaka), tripartite structural analysis (with colleague Patrick Doreian) and computational sociology (with colleague Norman P. Hummon). Two of his books are extended treatments of his approach to theoretical sociology.

(5) Social Network Analysis and Linton C. Freeman: In the early 1960s Freeman directed a sophisticated empirical study of community power structure. In 1978 he established the journal Social Networks. It rapidly became a major outlet for original research papers that used mathematical techniques to analyze network data. The journal also publishes conceptual and theoretical contributions, including his paper "Centrality in Social Networks: Conceptual Clarification." In turn, the mathematical concept defined in that paper led to further elaborations of the ideas, to experimental tests, and to numerous applications in empirical studies. He is the author of a study of the history and sociology of the field of social network analysis.

(6) Quantitative Methodology and Kenneth C. Land: Kenneth Land has been on the frontier of quantitative methodology in sociology as well as formal theoretical model building. The yearly volume Sociological Methodology has been one of Land's main outlets for the publication of papers that often lie in the intersection of quantitative methodology and mathematical sociology. Two of his theoretical papers appeared early in this journal: "Mathematical Formalization of Durkheim's Theory of Division of Labor" (1970) and "Formal Theory" (1971). His decades-long research program includes contributions relating to numerous special topics and methods, including social statistics, social indicators, stochastic processes, mathematical criminology, demography and social forecasting. Thus Land brings to these fields the skills of a statistician, a mathematician and a sociologist, combined.

(7) Affect Control Theory and David R. Heise: In 1979, Heise published a groundbreaking formal and empirical study in the tradition of interpretive sociology, especially symbolic interactionism, Understanding Events: Affect and the Construction of Social Action. It was the origination of a research program that has included his further theoretical and empirical studies and those of other sociologists, such as Lynn Smith-Lovin, Dawn Robinson and Neil MacKinnon. Definition of the situation and self-other definitions are two of the leading concepts in affect control theory. The formalism used by Heise and other contributors uses a validated form of measurement and a cybernetic control mechanism in which immediate feelings and compared with fundamental sentiments in such a way as to generate an effort to bring immediate feelings in a situation into correspondence with sentiments. In the simplest models, each person in an interactive pair, is represented in terms of one side of a role relationship in which fundamental sentiments associated with each role guide the process of immediate interaction. A higher level of the control process can be activated in which the definition of the situation is transformed. This research program comprises several of the key chapters in a 2006 volume of contributions to control systems theory (in the sense of Powers 1975) in sociology.

(8) "Distributive Justice Theory" and Guillermina Jasso: Since 1980, Jasso has treated problems of distributive justice with an original theory that uses mathematical methods. She has elaborated upon and applied this theory to a wide range of social phenomena. Her most general mathematical apparatus – with the theory of distributive justice as a special case—deals with any subjective comparison between some actual state and some reference level for it, e.g., a comparison of an actual reward with an expected reward. In her justice theory, she starts with a very simple premise, the justice evaluation function (the natural logarithm of the ratio of actual to just reward) and then derives numerous empirically testable implications.

(9) Collaborative research and John Skvoretz. A major feature of modern science is collaborative research in which the distinctive skills of the participants combine to produce original research. Skvoretz, in addition to this other contributions, has been a frequent collaborator in a variety of theoretical research programs, often using mathematical expertise as well as skills in experimental design, statistical data analysis and simulation methods. Some examples are: (1) Collaborative work on theoretical, statistical and mathematical problems in biased net theory. (2) Collaborative contributions to Expectation States Theory. (3) Collaborative contributions to Elementary Theory. (4) Collaboration with Bruce Mayhew in a structuralist research program. From the early 1970s, Skvoretz has been one of the most prolific of contributors to the advance of mathematical sociology.

The above discussion could be expanded to include many other programs and individuals including European sociologists such as Peter Abell and the late Raymond Boudon.

== Awards in mathematical sociology ==
The Mathematical Sociology section of The American Sociological Association in 2002 initiated awards for contributions to the field, including The James S. Coleman Distinguished Career Achievement Award. (Coleman had died in 1995 before the section had been established.) Given every other year, the awardees include some of those just listed in terms of their career-long research programs:

- 2024: Kathleen M. Carley, Carnegie Mellon University
- 2022: Guillermina Jasso, New York University
- 2020: Noah Friedkin, University of California, Santa Barbara
- 2018: Ronald Breiger, University of Arizona
- 2017: Lynn Smith-Lovin, Duke University.
- 2014: Philip Bonacich, University of California, Los Angeles.
- 2012: John Skvoretz, University of South Florida.
- 2010: David R. Heise, Indiana University.
- 2008: Scott Boorman, Yale University.
- 2006: Linton Freeman, University of California, Irvine.
- 2004: Thomas Fararo, University of Pittsburgh.
- 2002: Harrison White, Columbia University.

The section's other categories of awards and their recipients are listed at ASA Section on Mathematical Sociology

== Texts and journals ==
Mathematical sociology textbooks cover a variety of models, usually explaining the required mathematical background before discussing important work in the literature (Fararo 1973, Leik and Meeker 1975, Bonacich and Lu 2012). An earlier text by Otomar Bartos (1967) is still of relevance. Of wider scope and mathematical sophistication is the text by Rapoport (1983). A very reader-friendly and imaginative introduction to explanatory thinking leading to models is Lave and March (1975, reprinted 1993). The Journal of Mathematical Sociology (started in 1971) has been open to papers covering a broad spectrum of topics employing a variety of types of mathematics, especially through frequent special issues. Other journals in sociology who publish papers with substantial use of mathematics are Computational and Mathematical Organization Theory, Journal of social structure, Journal of Artificial Societies and Social Simulation

Articles in Social Networks, a journal devoted to social structural analysis, very often employ mathematical models and related structural data analyses. In addition – importantly indicating the penetration of mathematical model building into sociological research – the major comprehensive journals in sociology, especially The American Journal of Sociology and The American Sociological Review, regularly publish articles featuring mathematical formulations.

== See also ==
- Isaac Asimov's Foundation series, based on a massive expansion of the premise
- Positivism
- Statistics
- Computational sociology
- Game theory
- Thomas Schelling
- Peter Blau
- Harrison White
- Nicolas Rashevsky
- Society for Mathematical Biology
- Interpersonal ties
- James Samuel Coleman
- James D. Montgomery
- Thomas Fararo
- Social network
