= Patrick Doreian =

American mathematician (born 1941)

- Born: October 1, 1941 (age 83)
- Scientific career
- Fields: Social network analysis
- Institutions: University of Pittsburgh; London School of Economics; University of California-Irvine; University of Ljubljana
- Website: http://patrickdoreian.com/

Patrick Doreian is an American mathematician and social scientist, whose specialty is network analysis. His specific research interests include blockmodeling, social structure and network processes.

Doreian, professor emeritus from the University of Pittsburgh in sociology and statistics, was during his research career focused on social network research, especially regarding temporal networks, scientific collaboration, partitioning networks, signed networks, network autocorrelation and the US Supreme Court. He was also an (co)editor of The Journal of Mathematical Sociology (1982–2005) and Social Networks (2006–2015).

He was also a Centennial professor at the London School of Economics (2002) and a visiting professor at the University of California-Irvine and the University of Ljubljana.

== Work ==
With Thomas J. Fararo in 1984, he introduced tripartite structural analysis.

With Norman P. Hummon in 1989, he proposed a main path analysis, a mathematical tool, to identify the major paths in a citation network, which is one form of a directed acyclic graph (DAG).

In 1994, with Vladimir Batagelj and Anuška Ferligoj, he introduced the generalized blockmodeling.

== Awards ==
His co-authored book Generalized blockmodeling (with Vladimir Batagelj and Anuška Ferligoj), was in 2007 awarded the Harrison White Outstanding Book Award by the Mathematical Sociology Section of American Sociological Association.

== Selected bibliography ==
- P. Doreian, V. Batagelj, A. Ferligoj, Mark Granovetter (Series Editor), Generalized Blockmodeling (Structural Analysis in the Social Sciences), Cambridge University Press 2004 (ISBN 0-521-84085-6)
- P. Doreian and A. Mrvar, “A Partitioning Approach to Structural Balance”, Social Networks, Vol. 18, 1996, pp. 149–168
- P. Doreian and Andrej Mrvar (2009) “Partitioning Signed Social Networks”, Social Networks, Vol. 31: 1-11
- A. Mrvar and Patrick Doreian (2009), “Partitioning Signed Two-Mode Networks”, Journal of Mathematical Sociology, 33: 196-221
- A. Ferligoj, P. Doreian and V. Batagelj (2011): “Positions and Roles” Chapter 29 (pp 434–446) in John Scott and Peter Carrington (Eds.) Handbook of Social Network Analysis, Newbury Park: Sage Publications
- P. Doreian, V. Batagelj and A. Ferligoj (2004), “Generalized Blockmodeling Two-Mode Network Data”, Social Networks, Vol. 26(1) 29-53.

== See also ==
- Mathematical sociology
