= International Centre for Democratic Transition =

Hungarian think tank

- Abbreviation: ICDT
- Formation: 2005
- Type: Non-governmental organization
- Purpose: Collecting and sharing knowledge and experiences of democratic transitions
- Headquarters: Budapest, Hungary
- Region served: International
- Official language: English

The International Centre for Democratic Transition (ICDT) is a non-profit organization founded in 2005 based in Budapest, Hungary which collects the experiences of recent democratic transitions and shares them with those who are determined to follow that same path.

== History ==
The idea to establish an institute to collect and share the experiences of past democratic transitions originated from former US Ambassador Mark Palmer, Vice President of the Council for a Community of Democracies (CCD). His proposal was followed by a meeting between the Hungarian Foreign Minister László Kovács and the US Secretary of State in June 2004. At a conference in Budapest in March 2005 civil society and governmental leaders from Africa, Asia, Latin America, Europe, and the United States, as well as representatives of a number of international organizations approved the concept paper on the new Centre. Subsequently, the idea was presented by the Hungarian Foreign Minister at the Third Ministerial Conference of the Community of Democracies in Santiago de Chile. Once again, the idea was well received and endorsed by the participating Foreign Ministers, representing more than 100 democratic governments of the world. Finally, in September 2005, President of Hungary László Sólyom announced at the World Summit of the United Nations that "an International Centre for Democratic Transition (ICDT) has been set up in Budapest."

== Operational method ==
The ICDT:

- facilitates the process of democratic transition by using the knowledge pool of transitional experiences and by sharing best practices;
- convenes the most important indigenous stakeholders to play key roles in the transition process;
- provides an adaptable toolbox and appropriate models for the creation and consolidation of democratic institutions;
- mediates between cultures and regions by generating dialogue.

== Key achievements ==
- Pursued 23 distinct projects to promote democratic transition and share best practices and lessons learned;
- Established a strong presence in Moldova with a series of high-profile projects;
- Celebrated the 20th anniversary of the 1989 democratic changes in a dignified way, with a number of conferences and high-level events;
- Reached out to over a thousand members of civil society, government officials, and media representatives;
- Earned the trust of new donors including the Governments of Estonia, Switzerland, and Luxembourg;
- Established a long-term partnership with the Helen Bader Foundation;
- Achieved broad international recognition with the publication of A European Alternative for Belarus: Report of the Belarus Task Force;
- Published an Open Letter to the Obama Administration, which attracted international attention and debate;
- Enlisted Paula J. Dobriansky, April H. Foley, Nabila Hamza, Chandrika Bandaranaike Kumaratunga, Aleksandr Kwasniewski, Dr. Péter Medgyessy, George E. Pataki, George Soros, and Dr. Vaira Vīķe-Freiberga as new international board members.

== Program areas ==
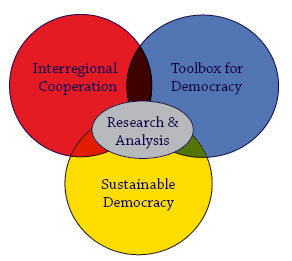

Interregional Cooperation
Promoting interregional cooperation between governments and civil societies of neighboring countries to enable democratic transition and to ensure regional stability.

Toolbox for Democracy
Providing technical assistance and learning opportunities to new and fragile democracies, concentrating on particular and practical elements of democracy such as elections and freedom of speech.

Sustainable Democracy
Strengthening the involvement of marginalized groups such as minorities, women and other unprotected social groups in both the transition process and the functioning of democracy.

Research and Analysis
Understanding and explaining the complex process of democratic transitions in order to forecast future trends and give recommendations for projects in the centre's three program areas.

== International board ==
The International Board of Directors of the Centre consists of prominent personalities from the areas of international politics, economics, the arts and the sciences.

Chairperson

- Janusz Onyszkiewicz, Vice-President of the European Parliament, former Minister of Defense, Poland

Members

- Madeleine Albright, former Secretary of State, chair, The Albright Group, USA
- Daniel Bader, President/CEO, Helen Bader Foundation, USA
- Donald M. Blinken, former United States Ambassador to Hungary, USA
- Nancy Brinker, former White House Chief of Protocol, Former Ambassador to Hungary, USA
- Kim Campbell, former Prime Minister, Canada
- Gustavo A. Cisneros, chairman of the Board of Directors of the Cisneros Group of Companies, USA
- Prof. Emil Constantinescu, former President of Romania 1996-2000
- Joel H. Cowan, President of Habersham & Cowan. Inc, USA
- Jayantha Dhanapala, former Under-Secretary General of the United Nations, Honorary President of the International Peace Bureau, Sri Lanka
- Paula J. Dobriansky, former Under Secretary of State for Democracy and Global Affairs, USA
- April H. Foley, former Ambassador to Hungary, USA
- György Habsburg, Archduke Georg of Austria, Ambassador, Hungary
- Nabila Hamza; President of the Foundation for the Future, Jordan
- Andrey Illarionov, Senior Fellow at the Cato Institute's Center for Global Liberty and Prosperity, USA
- President Chandrika Bandaranaike Kumaratunga, former president, Sri Lanka
- President Aleksander Kwaśniewski, former president, Poland
- President Ricardo Lagos, Former President of the Republic of Chile, Chile
- Ho-Jin Lee, former Ambassador to Hungary, South Korea
- Sonja Licht, Chair of the ICDT's executive committee, President and Founder of Belgrade Fund for Political Excellence, Serbia
- Markus Meckel, last Minister of Foreign Affairs of the GDR, Deputy Foreign Policy Speaker of the SPD, Germany
- Anatoli Mikhailov, President of EHU-International, Lithuania
- Mark Palmer, former Ambassador of the United States of America to Hungary, USA
- Governor George E. Pataki, Former Governor of New York; Co-Chairman of the Council on Foreign Relations Independent Task Force on Climate Change Issues, USA
- Thomas S. Rooney, CEO and Director, Energy Recovery Inc., USA
- Sima Samar, Chairperson, Afghanistan Independent Human Rights Commission, Afghanistan
- Narcís Serra, former Vice-President of the Spanish Government, President of CIDOB Foundation, Spain
- Prince Hassan bin Al Talal, President, Club of Rome, Jordan
- Borys Tarasyuk, Former Minister of Foreign Affairs, Ukraine
- Maximilian Teleki, President, Hungarian-American Coalition, USA
- Vaira Vīķe-Freiberga, Former President, Latvia
- Iván Vitányi, Member of Parliament, Hungary
- George Herbert Walker III, former Ambassador of the United States of America to Hungary, USA
- Sundeep Waslekar, President, Strategic Foresight Group, India
- † John C. Whitehead, Former Deputy Secretary of State, USA

Honorary Members

- Iván Bába, Administrative State Secretary of Foreign Affairs of Hungary
- Michel Barnier, Former Minister of Agriculture, France, Member of the Barroso Commission, Internal Market and Services
- Judge Alexander Boraine, former Member of the Truth and Reconciliation Commission, South Africa
- Toomas Hendrik Ilves, President, Estonia
- János Martonyi, Minister of Foreign Affairs, Hungary
- George Soros, Chairperson of Soros Fund Management, LLC and Founder of The Open Society Institute, USA
- † Bronislaw Geremek, MEP, Former Minister of Foreign Affairs, Solidarity Member, Poland

== Executive committee ==
The executive committee of the ICDT consists of five internationally recognized figures from the scientific and public arenas, elected for a term of three years by the International Board.

Chairperson

- Sonja Licht, President and Founder of the Belgrade Fund for Political Excellence

Members

- Daniel Bader, President/CEO, Helen Bader Foundation, USA
- April H. Foley, former US Ambassador to Hungary
- Ferenc Somogyi, former Minister of Foreign Affairs of Hungary, former Ambassador to the United States
- Botond Zákonyi, Director of the Hungarian Institute of International Affairs

== Governmental Advisory Board ==
The members of the GAB represent their governments. This body serves as an organized form of communication with the democratic governments of the world. So far over 40 democracies have delegated a representative to the ICDT's Governmental Advisory Board, which advises and appraises the work of the centre and makes proposals for specific projects.

Board of Trustees

- Victor Rico, Secretary for Political Affairs, Organization of American States (OAS)
- Mira Hoxha, Ambassador to Hungary, Albania
- John Griffin, Ambassador to Hungary, Australia
- Michael Zimmermann, Ambassador to Hungary, Austria
- Pierre Labouverie, Ambassador to Hungary, Belgium
- Nicola Ðukić, Ambassador to Hungary, Bosnia and Herzegovina
- Evgenia Koldanova, Deputy Minister of Foreign Affairs, Bulgaria
- Tamara Lynne Guttman, Ambassador to Hungary, Canada
- Ivan Bandić, Ambassador to Hungary, Croatia
- Gabriela Dlouhá, Director at the Ministry of Foreign Affairs, Human Rights & Transition Policy Department, Czech Republic
- Priit Pallum, Ambassador to Hungary, Estonia
- Hannu Kyröläinen, Director General, Department for Global Affairs, Ministry of Foreign Affairs, Finland
- Zviad Chumburidze, Ambassador to Hungary, Georgia
- Spyridon Georgiles, Ambassador to Hungary, Greece
- Gauri Shankar Gupta, Ambassador to Hungary, India
- Gian B. Campagnola, Ambassador to Hungary, Italy
- Tetsuo Ito, Ambassador to Hungary, Japan
- Makram Mustafa Queisi, Ambassador accredited to Hungary, Jordan
- Dorothy Angote, Permanent Secretary, Ministry of Lands, Kenya
- Chung-Ha Suh, Ambassador to Hungary, Republic of Korea
- Shkëndije Sherifi, Ambassador to Hungary, Kosovo
- Veronika Erte, Ambassador to Hungary, Latvia
- Renatas Juška, Ambassador to Hungary, Lithuania
- Marc Courte, Ambassador to Hungary, Luxembourg
- Alexandru Codreanu, Ambassador to Hungary, Moldova
- Ochir Enkhtsetseg, Ambassador to the United Nations, Mongolia
- Vesko Garčević, Political Director, Ministry of Foreign Affairs, Montenegro
- Robert Milders, Ambassador to Hungary, the Netherlands
- Siri Ellen Sletner, Ambassador to Hungary, Norway
- Roman Kowalski, Ambassador to Hungary, Poland
- António Augusto Jorge Mendes, Ambassador to Hungary, Portugal
- Bogdan Mazuru, State Secretary for European Affairs, Ministry of Foreign Affairs, Romania
- Damjan Krnjevic-Miskovic, Advisor of the Minister of Foreign Affairs, Serbia
- Peter Weiss, Ambassador to Hungary, Slovakia
- Darja Bavdaž Kuret, Ambassador to Hungary, Slovenia
- Enrique Pastor de Gana, Ambassador to Hungary, Spain
- Karin Ulrika Olofsdotter, Ambassador to Hungary, Sweden
- Martin Michelet, Head of the Human Rights Policy Section of the Federal Department of Foreign Affairs, Switzerland
- Rwekaza Sympho Mukandala, Executive Chairperson of the Research on Democracy and Education, Tanzania
- Hasan Kemal Gür, Ambassador to Hungary, Turkey
- Yurii Mushka, Ambassador to Hungary, Ukraine
- Gregory Dorey, Ambassador to Hungary, United Kingdom
- Angela Kane, Under-Secretary-General for Management, United Nations
- Eleni Tsakopoulos Kounalakis, Ambassador to Hungary, United States of America

== Advisors ==
- Cesar D. Beltran, Senior Advisor
- Armando Marques Guedes, Senior Advisor
- André Erdős, Senior Advisor
- Attila Komlós, Senior Advisor
- Sándor Köles, Senior Advisor

== Staff ==
- István Gyarmati, President of the Center for Democracy Public Foundation
- Gáspár Várkonyi, Managing Director of the Center for Democracy Public Foundation
- László Várkonyi, President of the International Centre for Democratic Transition
