= R. Bruce Hitchner =

American classicist

- Education: University of Michigan
- Scientific career
- Fields: Classical studies
- Institutions: Tufts University

Robert Bruce Hitchner is an American classicist who specializes in the history and archaeology of the Greco-Roman world. He is Professor of Classical Studies and International Relations, and Chair of the Department of Classical Studies at Tufts University.

Hitchner received his Ph.D. from the University of Michigan.

Hitchner has published extensively on the archaeology and history of ancient Rome. He served as the Editor-in-Chief of the American Journal of Archaeology from 1998 to 2006.

He has authored a number of op-eds, papers, and interviews for the International Centre for Democratic Transition, the Center for Strategic and International Studies, the United States Institute of Peace, the Wall Street Journal and the International Herald Tribune/New York Times.

Hitchner has directed a number of archaeological excavations in France and North Africa, with support from the Ministry of Culture of France, the National Endowment for the Humanities, and the National Geographic Society.

Hitchner was the founder and Chair of the Dayton Peace Accords Project from 1998 to 2014. He was a member of the international negotiating team which assisted the political parties of Bosnia-Herzegovina in producing the Package of Amendments to the Dayton Constitution of April 2006.

Hitchner has been a visiting fellow at Churchill College, Cambridge (1994-1995), the Center for Human Values at Princeton University (2003-2003) and All Souls College, Oxford (2010).

== Publications ==
- (editor). A Companion to North Africa in Antiquity. 2022.
