= Kuret =

Kuret is a surname. Notable people with the surname include:

- Darja Bavdaž Kuret (born 1956), Slovenian diplomat, social scientist, and women's rights advocate
- Ivan Kuret (born 1971), Croatian politician
- Karlo Kuret (born 1970), Croatian sailor
