= Metodološki zvezki =

- Discipline: Methodology, statistics
- Language: English, Slovenian
- Edited by: Valentina Hlebec, Lara Lusa

Publication details
- History: 2004–present
- Publisher: Faculty of Social Sciences, Ljubljana (Slovenia)

Standard abbreviations
- ISO 4: Metod. Zv.

Indexing
- ISSN: 1854-0023

Links
- Journal homepage

Metodološki zvezki – Advances in Methodology and Statistics is a peer-reviewed academic journal covering methodology and statistics, published by the Faculty of Social Sciences of the University of Ljubljana.

Anuška Ferligoj and Andrej Mrvar were the founding editors-in-chief.

== Abstracting and indexing ==
From 2011 to 2019 the journal was abstracted and indexed in Scopus.

== See also ==
- List of academic journals published in Slovenia
