= Deterministic blockmodeling =

Blockmodeling process

Deterministic blockmodeling is an approach in blockmodeling that does not assume a probabilistic model, and instead relies on the exact or approximate algorithms, which are used to find blockmodel(s). This approach typically minimizes some inconsistency that can occur with the ideal block structure. Such analysis is focused on clustering (grouping) of the network (or adjacency matrix) that is obtained with minimizing an objective function, which measures discrepancy from the ideal block structure.

However, some indirect approaches (or methods between direct and indirect approaches, such as CONCOR) do not explicitly minimize inconsistencies or optimize some criterion function.

This approach was popularized in the 1970s, due to the presence of two computer packages (CONCOR and STRUCTURE) that were used to "find a permutation of the rows and columns in the adjacency matrix leading to an approximate block structure".

The opposite approach to deterministic blockmodeling is a stochastic blockmodeling approach.

== See also ==
- Blockmodeling
