= Confirmatory blockmodeling =

Confirmatory blockmodeling is a deductive approach in blockmodeling, where a blockmodel (or part of it) is prespecify before the analysis, and then the analysis is fit to this model. When only a part of analysis is prespecify (like individual cluster(s) or location of the block types), it is called partially confirmatory blockmodeling.

This is so-called indirect approach, where the blockmodeling is done on the blockmodel fitting (e.g., a priori hypothesized blockmodel).

Opposite approach to the confirmatory blockmodeling is an inductive exploratory blockmodeling.

== See also ==
- prespecific blockmodeling
