= Generalized blockmodeling of binary networks =

Generalized blockmodeling of binary networks (also relational blockmodeling) is an approach of generalized blockmodeling, analysing the binary network(s).

As most network analyses deal with binary networks, this approach is also considered as the fundamental approach of blockmodeling. This is especially noted, as the set of ideal blocks, when used for interpretation of blockmodels, have binary link patterns, which precludes them to be compared with valued empirical blocks.

When analysing the binary networks, the criterion function is measuring block inconsistencies, while also reporting the possible errors. The ideal block in binary blockmodeling has only three types of conditions: "a certain cell must be (at least) 1, a certain cell must be 0 and the $f$ over each row (or column) must be at least 1".

It is also used as a basis for developing the generalized blockmodeling of valued networks.

== See also ==
- homogeneity blockmodeling
- binary relation
- binary matrix
