= Linked network =

Type of network

Linked network in statistics is a network, which is composed of one-node networks, where the nodes from different one-node networks are connected through two-node networks. This means, that "linked networks are collections of networks defined on different sets of nodes", where all sets of nodes must be connected to each other.

Different examples of linked networks are:

- multilevel networks,
- dynamic networks (networks, measured at several different points in time),
- dynamic multilevel networks, measured at several different points in time,
- meta-networks, based on the PCANS model.

== See also ==
- mathematical sociology
