= Mojca Kleva =

Slovenian politician (born 1976)

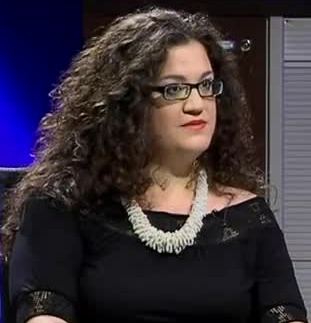

Member of the European Parliament
- In office May 9, 2011 – 30 June 2014

Permanent Representative of the National Assembly of the Republic of Slovenia to the European Parliament
- In office 2009–2011

Advisor for the Enlargement of the European Union in the Progressive Alliance of Socialists and Democrats
- In office 2002–2002

Member of Municipal Council of Koper
- In office 1999–2009

Personal details
- Born: 30 March 1976 (age 50) Koper, SR Slovenija, Yugoslavia
- Party: Social Democrats (Slovenia)
- Other political affiliations: Progressive Alliance of Socialists and Democrats
- Education: Faculty of Social Sciences at the University of Ljubljana
- Website: MojcaKleva.eu

Mojca Kleva (born March 30, 1976) is a Slovene political scientist and politician born in Koper (Slovenia). On May 9, 2011 she became a Member of the European Parliament replacing Zoran Thaler who resigned from the position due to accusations regarding corruption. She is a member of Social Democrats, center-left wing political party in Slovenia.

== Biography ==
Mojca Kleva graduated from the Faculty of Social Sciences at the University of Ljubljana in political science in 2002 and later acquired master's degree also in political science in 2006.

After her studies Kleva was following the EU accession process of Estonia and Lithuania at the European Parliament in Brussels. In 2004 she returned to Slovenia where she became an advisor in the National Assembly of the Republic of Slovenia, working on areas of European affairs, human rights and education. In 2009 she became a permanent representative of the National Assembly of the Republic of Slovenia to the European Parliament in Brussels. In May 2011 Mojca Kleva replaced Zoran Thaler as a member of the European Parliament within S&D (Group of the Progressive Alliance of Socialists and Democrats).

Between 1999 and 2009 Mojca Kleva was a member Municipal Council of Koper, she also actively participated and led network of non-governmental organizations from the field of women's rights - Women's lobby Slovenia between 2007 and 2009.

== Member of the European Parliament ==
- Group of the Progressive Alliance of Socialists & Democrats in the European Parliament (S&D), Member
- Committee on Regional Development, Member
- Committee on Economic and Monetary Affairs, Substitute
- Committee on Women's Rights and Gender Equality, Substitute
- Delegation to the EU-Armenia, EU-Azerbaijan and EU-Georgia Parliamentary Cooperation Committees, Vice-president
- Delegation to the Euronest Parliamentary Assembly, Member
- Delegation to EU-Former Yugoslav Republic of Macedonia Joint Parliamentary Committee, Substitute
