= Thomas Fararo =

American sociologist (1933–2020)

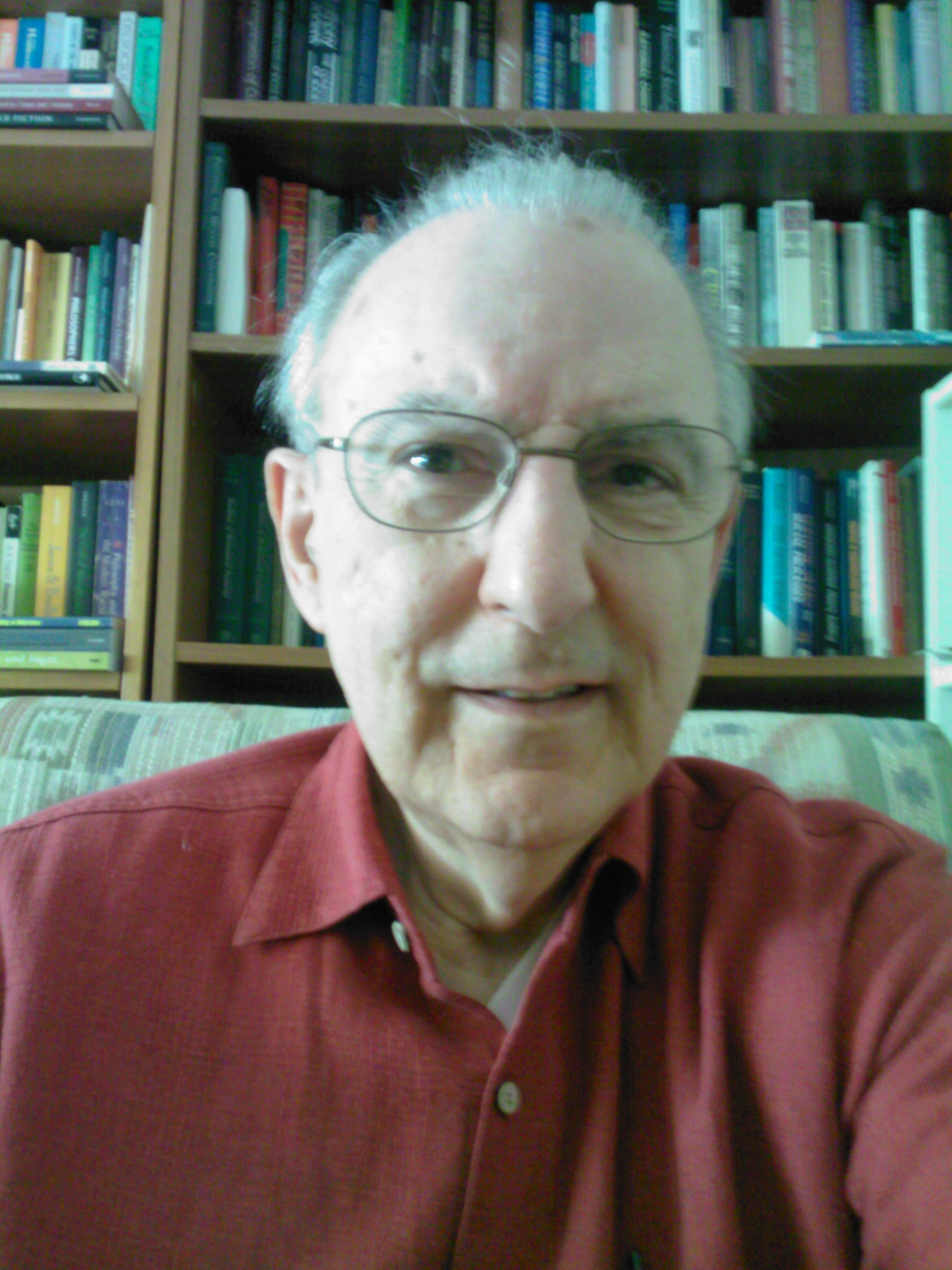
Thomas J. Fararo

Thomas J. Fararo (February 11, 1933 - August 20, 2020) was Distinguished Service Professor Emeritus at the University of Pittsburgh. After earning a Ph.D. in sociology at Syracuse University in 1963, he received a three-year postdoctoral fellowship for studies in pure and applied mathematics at Stanford University (1964–1967). In 1967, he joined the faculty of University of Pittsburgh; during 1972–1973, he was visiting professor at the University of York in England.

Fararo is listed in American Men and Women of Science, Who's Who in America, and Who's Who in Frontier Science and Technology. In 1998, he received the Distinguished Career Award from the Mathematical Sociology section of the American Sociological Association.

In addition to over a dozen books, Fararo has published over two dozen book chapters, over one dozen articles in reference works, and over 50 journal articles. Some of his books are edited works that relate to his career-long interest in making mathematical ideas relevant to the development of sociological theory.

Fararo has served on the editorial boards of the American Journal of Sociology, the American Sociological Review, the Journal of Mathematical Sociology, Social Networks, Sociological Forum, and Sociological Theory.

Fararo has been both an originator and an explicator of ideas and methods relating to the use of formal methods in sociological theory. In his original work, he has employed theories and methods relating to social networks in combination with a focus on social processes. This combination is illustrated by the theoretical method he has called E-state Structuralism (where E stands for Expectations) with work on this done with former student John Skvoretz. He often employed the axiomatic method in such work, as in the 2003 monograph with his student Kenji Kosaka that sets out a formal theory of how images of stratification are generated.

In his expository work, he has attempted to move the field of sociology closer to a conception of theorizing that is more formal, as in his 1973 book Mathematical Sociology and in various papers and edited books, including the 1984 volume Mathematical Ideas and Sociological Theory.

One of his objectives has been to articulate a coherent vision of the core of sociological theory: its philosophy, its key theoretical problems, and its methods, especially those employing formal representation. This objective is represented in his 1989 book, The Meaning of General Theoretical Sociology: Tradition and Formalization.

The general vision that informs Fararo's theoretical work is "the spirit of unification," a theme that is set out in Social Action Systems: Foundation and Synthesis in Sociological Theory, a 2001 book that analyzes key theories from the standpoint of the aspiration of synthesis, moving toward more comprehensive theories of social life.

== Selected works ==
- A Study of a Biased Friendship Net (with M. Sunshine).(1964)
- Mathematical Sociology. (1973)
- Mathematical Ideas and Sociological Theory (ed.) (1984)
- The Meaning of General Theoretical Sociology: Tradition and Formalization. (1989)
- Rational Choice Theory: Advocacy and Critique (ed. with James Samuel Coleman). (1992)
- The Problem of Solidarity: Theory and Models (ed. with P. Doreian) (1998)
- Social Action Systems: Foundation and Synthesis in Sociological Theory. (2001)
- Generating Images of Stratification: A Formal Theory. (with K. Kosaka) (2003)
- Purpose, Meaning and Action: Control System Theories in Sociology. (ed. with K. McClelland) (2006)
- Suburban Power Structures and Public Education (with others). (1963)
