= Sonja Licht =

Serbian sociologist and political activist (born 1947)

Sonja Licht Соња Лихт סוניה ליכט
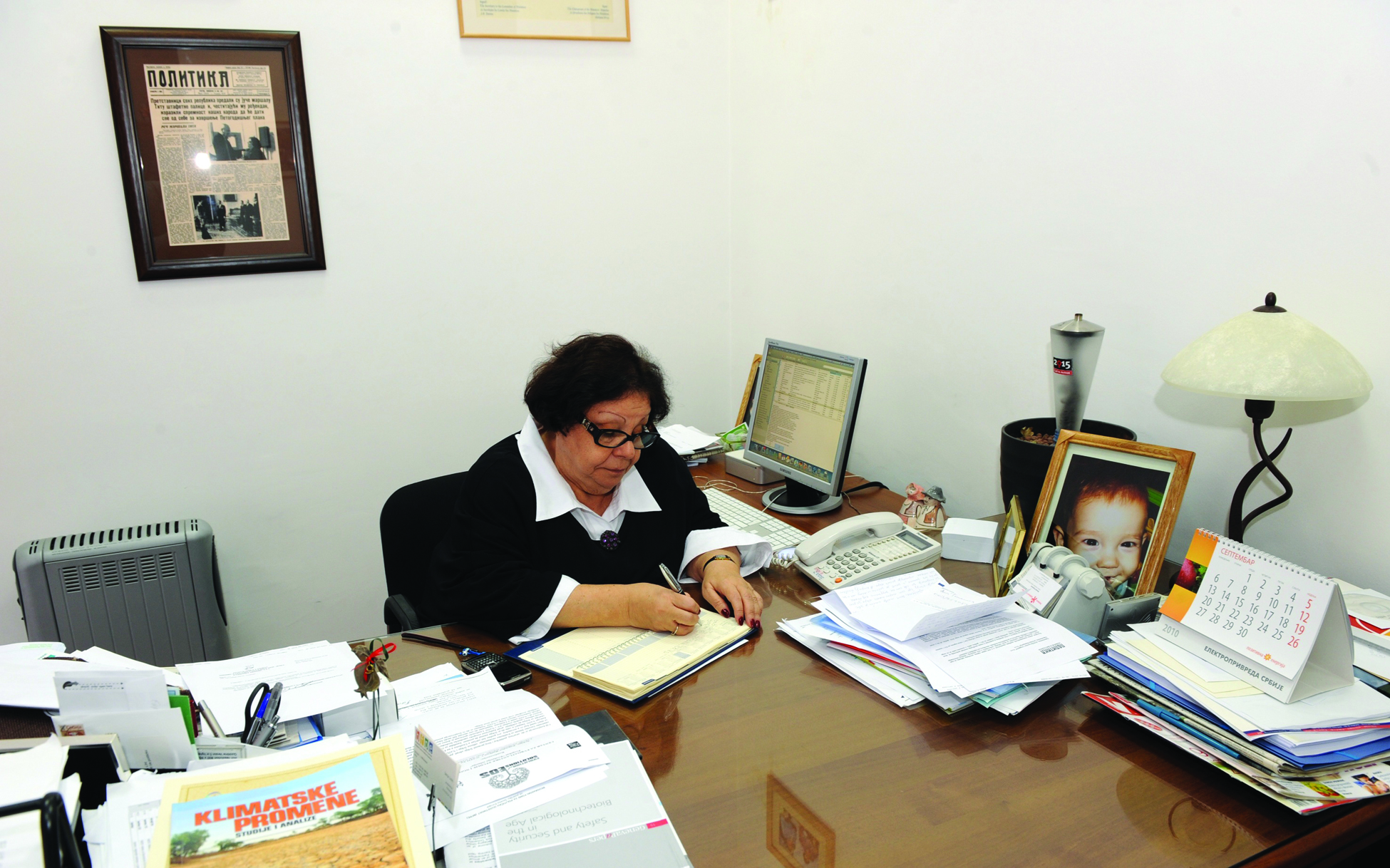
- Born: 1947 (age 78–79); Subotica, Yugoslavia
- Education: University of Belgrade
- Occupations: Sociologist; activist
- Organization: BFPE (2003-present)

Sonja Licht (Serbo-Croatian Cyrillic: Соња Лихт, Hebrew: סוניה ליכט, born 1947 in Subotica, Serbia, FPR Yugoslavia) is a Serbian sociologist and political activist.

== Biography ==
Born to Jewish parents Antun and Susana Licht, she obtained a diploma in sociology at the University of Belgrade Faculty of Philosophy. She is currently president of Beogradski fond za političku izuzetnost (Belgrade Fund for Political Excellence). The aim of this non-governmental organization is to educate young Serbian politicians, MPs and party leaders, in order to facilitate the transition toward democracy and EU membership. Sonja Licht is the founder and President of BFPE.

Previously, for more than a decade (1991–2003), she was the president of another non-governmental organization — Fond za Otvoreno Društvo (Open Society Fund), a Serbian branch of George Soros funded Open Society Institute. Editors of the Vreme magazin elected Licht as Person of the Year in 2007.

From 2008 to 2012 she was a member of Politika AD's managing board. She has been awarded several high prizes for her public work.

== Honors and awards ==
- Legion of Honour, Knight (France).
- Order of the Star of Italian Solidarity, Knight (Italy).
- Bundesverdienstkreuz, Member (Germany)

Preceded by Position created	CEO of BFPE; 2003–	Succeeded by Incumbent
Preceded by Position created	president of OSF; 1991–2003	Succeeded by Incumbent
