= John Skvoretz =

John Skvoretz is an American social scientist, focusing on theoretical methods, group processes and social psychology, and network analysis and modeling, currently at University of South Florida.
