= Signed network =

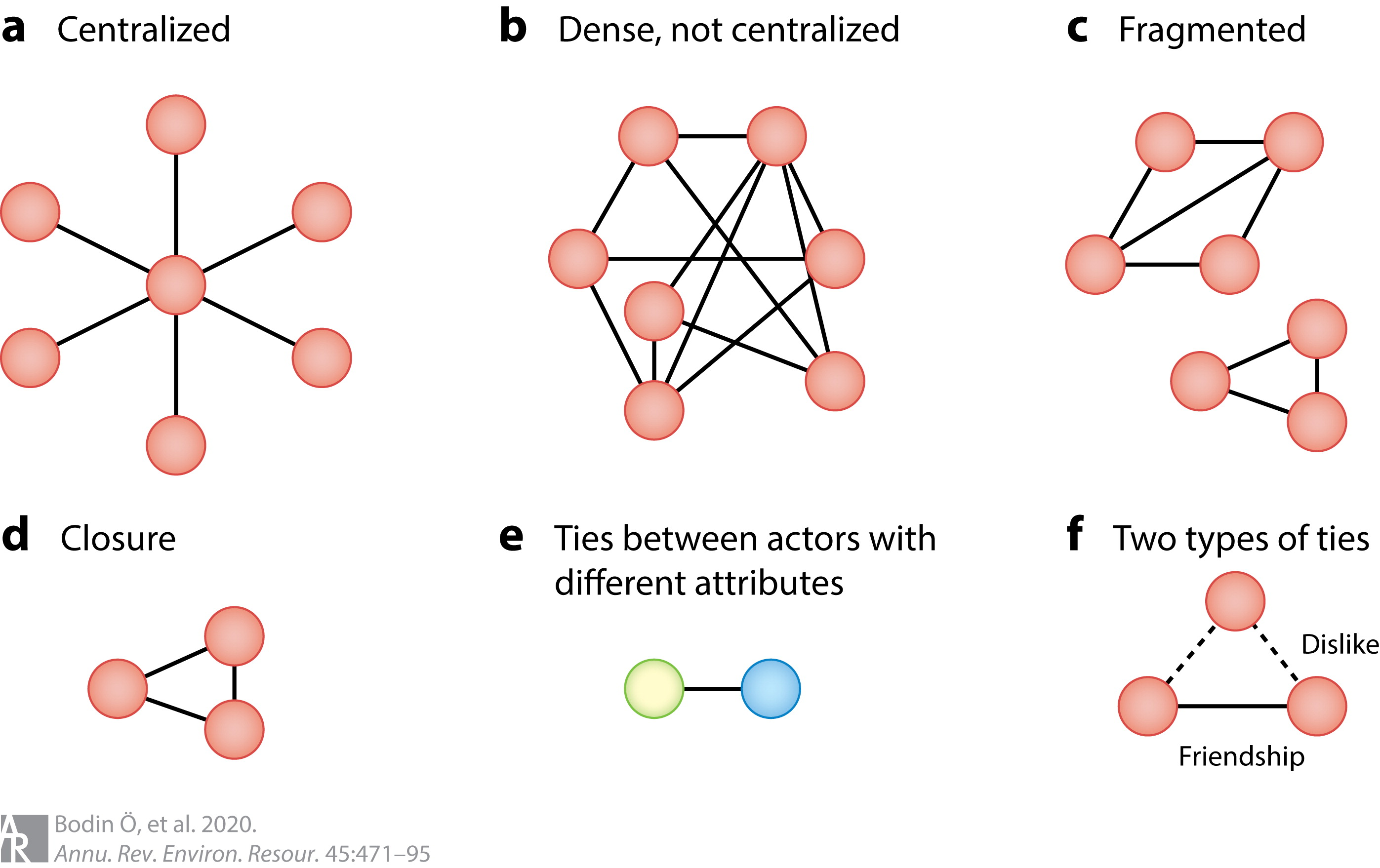
Panel F consists of two types of ties: friendship (solid line) and dislike (dashed line). In this case, two actors being friends both dislike a common third (or, similarly, two actors that dislike a common third tend to be friends).

In a social network analysis (as in blockmodeling), a positive or a negative 'friendship' can be established between two nodes in a network; this results in a signed network. As social interaction between people can be positive or negative, so can be links between the nodes (representing persons).

When a positive or a negative value is attributed on the relationship between the two nodes, it is called a user evaluation. In social groups, people can like or dislike, respect or disrespect other people in their social groups.

The quality of such connections can be further analysed, as a positive connections can have a positive influence on the whole network (one person on social group or society in general) and vice versa.

When network connections are not evaluated between the nodes (e.g., all connections are regarded as positive - as they exist), then such a network is defined as an unsigned network.

For intrinsically dense unsigned networks where link weights can be observed, the underlying networks may actually be signed networks. The underlying signed network backbones can be extracted using significance filter and vigor filter using open-source software packages in R and Python.

== See also ==
- Signed graph
- Balance theory
