= Andrej Mrvar =

Slovenian mathematician

- Education: University of Ljubljana (PhD); University of Ljubljana (MS); University of Ljubljana (BA)
- Scientific career
- Fields: Computer Science
- Workplaces: University of Ljubljana
- Thesis: Analiza in prikaz velikih omrežij (1999)
- Doctoral advisor: Vladimir Batagelj; Saša Divjak
- Website: http://mrvar.fdv.uni-lj.si/

Andrej Mrvar is a Slovenian computer scientist and a professor at the University of Ljubljana's Faculty of Social Sciences. He is known for his work in network analysis, graph drawing, decision making, virtual reality, timing and data processing of sports competitions.

== Education and career ==
He is well known for his work on Pajek, a free software for analysis and visualization of large networks. Mrvar began work on Pajek in 1996 with Vladimir Batagelj.

His book Exploratory Social Network Analysis with Pajek, coauthored with Wouter de Nooy and Vladimir Batagelj, is his most cited work. It was published by Cambridge University Press in three editions (first 2005, second 2011, and third 2018). The book was translated into Japanese (2009) and Chinese (first edition 2012, second 2014).

With Anuška Ferligoj, he was a founding co-editor-in-chief of the Metodološki zvezki - Advances in Methodology and Statistics journal.

== Awards and honors ==
- Vidmar Award (Faculty of Electrical and Computer Engineering, University of Ljubljana): 1988, 1990
- First prizes for contributions (with Vladimir Batagelj) to Graph Drawing Contests in years: 1995, 1996, 1997, 1998, 1999, 2000 and 2005 / Graph Drawing Hall of Fame.
- Award of University of Ljubljana for contributions in education and research (Svečana listina Univerze v Ljubljani za pomembne dosežke na področju vzgojnoizobraževalnega in znanstvenoraziskovalega dela): 2001
- The INSNA's William D. Richards Software award for work on Pajek (with Vladimir Batagelj): 2013
- Award of Faculty of Social Sciences, University of Ljubljana for scientific excellence (Priznanje za znanstveno odličnost): 2013

== Selected publications ==
- Wouter de Nooy, Andrej Mrvar, Vladimir Batagelj, Mark Granovetter (Series Editor), Exploratory Social Network Analysis with Pajek (Structural Analysis in the Social Sciences), Cambridge University Press (First Edition: 2005, Second Edition: 2011, Third Edition: 2018 ). Japanese Translation (2010). Chinese Translation (First Edition: 2012, Second Edition: 2014)
- Andrej Mrvar and Vladimir Batagelj, Analysis and visualization of large networks with program package Pajek. Complex Adaptive Systems Modeling, 4:6. SpringerOpen, 2016
- Vladimir Batagelj and Andrej Mrvar, Some Analyses of Erdős Collaboration Graph, Social Networks, 22, 173–186, 2000
- Vladimir Batagelj and Andrej Mrvar, A Subquadratic Triad Census Algorithm for Large Sparse Networks with Small Maximum Degree. Social Networks, 23, 237–243, 2001
- Patrick Doreian and Andrej Mrvar, A Partitioning Approach to Structural Balance, Social Networks, 18, 149–168, 1996
- Patrick Doreian and Andrej Mrvar, Partitioning Signed Social Networks, Social Networks, 31, 1–11, 2009
- Andrej Mrvar and Patrick Doreian, Partitioning Signed Two-Mode Networks, Journal of Mathematical Sociology, 33, 196–221, 2009
- Patrick Doreian and Andrej Mrvar, The international reach of the Koch brothers network. In: Antonyuk, A. and Basov, N. (Eds.): Networks in the Global World V. NetGloW 2020. Lecture Notes in Networks and Systems, 181, 225–235. Springer, 2021
- Patrick Doreian and Andrej Mrvar, Delineating Changes in the Fundamental Structure of Signed Networks, Frontiers in Physics, 294, 1–11, 2021
- Patrick Doreian and Andrej Mrvar, Hubs and Authorities in the Koch Brothers Network. Social Networks, Social Networks, 64, 148–157, 2021
- Patrick Doreian and Andrej Mrvar, Public issues, policy proposals, social movements, and the interests of the Koch Brothers network of allies, Quality and Quantity, 56, 305–322, 2022
- Douglas R. White, Vladimir Batagelj, Andrej Mrvar, Analyzing Large Kinship and Marriage Networks with Pgraph and Pajek. Social Science Computer Review, 17, 245–274, 1999
- Ion Georgiou, Ronald Concer, Andrej Mrvar, A Systemic Approach to Sociometric Group Research: Advancing The Work of Leslie Day Zeleny, 1939–1947, Social Networks, 63, 174–200, 2020
