= Social forecasting =

Social forecasting is a crowdsourcing approach, the aim of which is to aggregate the distributed knowledge of employees and experts and convert it into quantifiable business indicators, which are then available to the company management.

One of the earliest attempts to study social forecasting and its theory were made by Adolf Bauer and Wolfgang Eichhorn in 1968.
