= Generalized blockmodeling of valued networks =

Generalized blockmodeling of valued networks is an approach of the generalized blockmodeling, dealing with valued networks (e.g., non-binary).

While the generalized blockmodeling signifies a "formal and integrated approach for the study of the underlying functional anatomies of virtually any set of relational data", it is in principle used for binary networks. This is evident from the set of ideal blocks, which are used to interpret blockmodels, that are binary, based on the characteristic link patterns. Because of this, such templates are "not readily comparable with valued empirical blocks".

To allow generalized blockmodeling of valued directional (one-mode) networks (e.g. allowing the direct comparisons of empirical valued blocks with ideal binary blocks), a non–parametric approach is used. With this, "an optional parameter determines the prominence of valued ties as a minimum percentile deviation between observed and expected flows". Such two–sided application of parameter then introduces "the possibility of non–determined ties, i.e. valued relations that are deemed neither prominent (1) nor non–prominent (0)." Resulted occurrences of links then motivate the modification of the calculation of inconsistencies between empirical and ideal blocks. At the same time, such links also give a possibility to measure the interpretational certainty, which is specific to each ideal block. Such maximum two–sided deviation threshold, holding the aggregate uncertainty score at zero or near–zero levels, is then proposed as "a measure of interpretational certainty for valued blockmodels, in effect transforming the optional parameter into an outgoing state".

Problem with blockmodeling is the standard set of ideal block, as they are all specified using binary link (tie) patters; this results in "a non–trivial exercise to match and count inconsistencies between such ideal binary ties and empirical valued ties". One approach to solve this is by using dichotomization to transform the network into a binary version. The other two approaches were first proposed by Aleš Žiberna in 2007 by introducing valued (generalized) blockmodeling and also homogeneity blockmodeling. The basic idea of the latter is "that the inconsistency of an empirical block with its ideal block can be measured by within block variability of appropriate values". The newly–formed ideal blocks, which are appropriate for blockmodeling of valued networks, are then presented together with the definitions of their block inconsistencies. Two other approaches were later suggested by Carl Nordlund in 2019: deviational approach and correlation-based generalized approach. Both Nordlund's approaches are based on the idea, that valued networks can be compared with the ideal block without values.

With this approach, more information is retained for analysis, which also means, that there are fewer partitions having identical values of the criterion function. This means, that the generalized blockmodeling of valued networks measures the inconsistencies more precisely. Usually, only one optimal partition is found in this approach, especially when it is used by homogeneity blockmodeling. Contrary, while using binary blockmodeling on the same sample, usually more than one optimal partition had occurred on several occasions.

== See also ==
- Generalized blockmodeling of binary networks
- Homogeneity blockmodeling
