= Anuška Ferligoj =

Slovenian mathematician

- Born: August 19, 1947 (age 78); Ljubljana, Slovenia
- Scientific career
- Fields: Mathematics
- Institutions: University of Ljubljana
- Thesis: Razvrščanje v skupine z omejitvami (1983)
- Doctoral advisor: Branislav Ivanović
- Doctoral students: Aleš Žiberna

Anuška Ferligoj is a Slovenian mathematician, born August 19, 1947, in Ljubljana, Slovenia, whose specialty is statistics and network analysis. Her specific interests include multivariate analysis (theory and application in social sciences, medicine, etc.), cluster analysis (constraints, multi-criteria clustering), social network analysis (blockmodeling, reliability and validity of network measurement), methodological research of public opinion, analysis of scientific networks. She is a professor emeritus at the University of Ljubljana, Slovenia.

== Early life and education ==
Ferligoj obtained her B.S. in mathematics and physics in 1971, and her M.S. in operational research in 1979 from the University of Ljubljana. In 1983 she obtained her Ph.D. in information science from the same university under the supervision of Professor Branislav Ivanović.

== Career ==
Since 1972, Ferligoj was employed as assistant, assistant professor, associate professor and finally from 1994 as full professor at the Faculty of Social Sciences. In 2003–2005, she was the dean of the Faculty of Social Sciences. In 1992–2012, she was the head of the Centre for Methodology and Informatics at the Institute of Social Sciences. In 2002–2013, she headed the graduate program on statistics, and in 2012–2020 the master program on applied statistics. She has been a professor emeritus there since 2020.

She was a Fulbright scholar in 1990—1991 and visiting professor at the University of Pittsburgh (1996) and at the University of Vienna (2009/10). She was awarded the title of Ambassador of Science of the Republic of Slovenia in 1997.

== Academic service ==
Ferligoj chaired the Statistical Society of Slovenia in 1982 – 1983. She was the president of the Statistical Council of the Republic of Slovenia (2007–2021) and a member of the European Statistical Advisory Committee (ESAC) (2011–2015).

She was founding editor of the journal Advances in Methodology and Statistics (Metodološki zvezki) in 1987 – 2012.

== Awards and honours ==
Ferligoj twice received awards of Statistical Society of Slovenia – in 1997, and in 2012 (Marijan Blejec award).

The book Generalized Blockmodeling that she coauthored received Harrison White Outstanding Book Award by Mathematical Sociology Section of the American Sociological Association in 2007. Jointly with Vladimir Batagelj, she received Simmel award from the International Network for Social Network Analysis.

In 2007 and 2008, students at the Faculty of Social Science chose her as the best professor. She received Doctor et Professor Honoris Causa at Eötvös Loránd University in Budapest in 2010, and Golden Plaque of University of Ljubljana in 2012.

She is an elected member of the European Academy of Sociology and International Statistical Institute.

== Selected bibliography ==
Ferligoj is an author of scientific papers in the international journals in the field of methodology, statistics and social network analysis, and chapters in the monographs. Her most important books include:

- Patrick Doreian, Vladimir Batagelj, Anuška Ferligoj, Mark Granovetter (Series Editor), Generalized Blockmodeling (Structural Analysis in the Social Sciences), Cambridge University Press 2004 (ISBN 0-521-84085-6)
- Anuška Ferligoj, Rener, T., & Ule, M. 1990. Ženska, zasebno, politično ali" Ne vem, sem neodločena". Znanstveno in publicistično središče. URL:
- Anuška Ferligoj. 1995, 1997. Osnove statistike na prosojnicah. Samozaložba. URL:
- Ferligoj, A., Leskošek, K., & Kogovšek, T. 1995. Zanesljivost in veljavnost merjenja. Fakulteta za družbene vede. URL:
- Blaženka, K., Franc, A., Alojzija, D. U., Anuška, F., & Matjaž, O. 1994, 2001. Statistični terminološki slovar. Ljubljana: Statistično društvo Slovenije: Statistični urad Republike Slovenije. URL:
- Vladimir Batagelj, Anuška Ferligoj, & Žiberna, A. (Editors). Data Science and Classification, Springer, 2006. URL:
- Vladimir Batagelj, Patrick Doreian, Anuška Ferligoj, & Kejžar, N. 2014. Understanding large temporal networks and spatial networks: Exploration, pattern searching, visualization and network evolution. John Wiley & Sons. URL:
- Patrick Doreian, Vladimir Batagelj, & Anuška Ferligoj (Editors). Advances in Network Clustering and Blockmodeling. John Wiley & Sons, 2020. URL:
- ResearcherId: A-3675-2009

== See also ==
- Aleš Žiberna
