= Darja Bavdaž Kuret =

Slovenian diplomat, social scientist

Darja Bavdaž Kuret (born 1956) is a Slovenian diplomat, social scientist and women's rights advocate. Following several ambassadorial posts since 1995, she was appointed Permanent Representative of Slovenia to the United Nations in August 2017. Bavdaž Kuret is a keen supporter of equal rights for women. From September 2023 to October 2024, Bavdaž Kuret served as Slovenia's Ambassador to Russia.

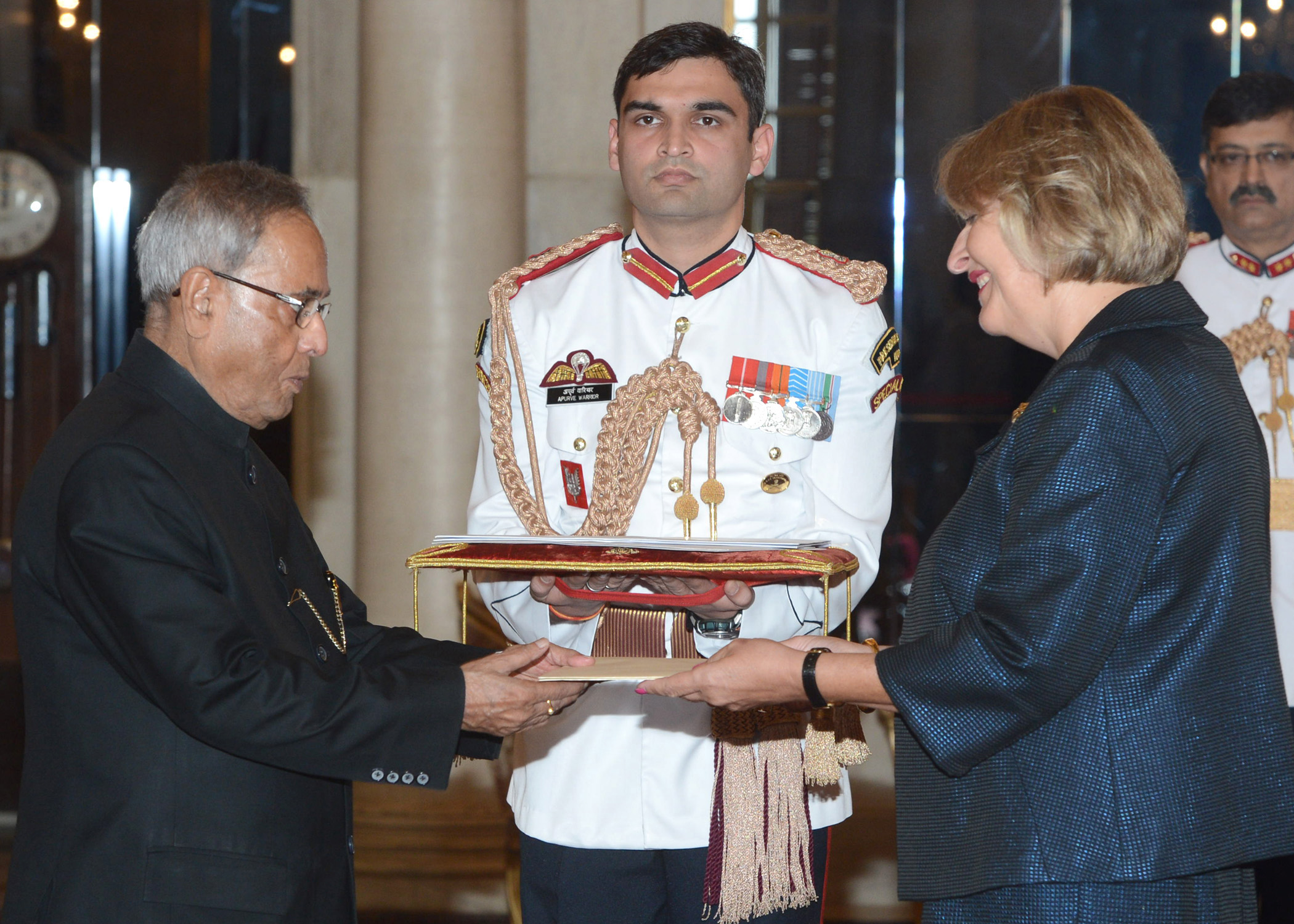
Bavdaž Kuret presenting credentials to Shri Pranab Mukherjee as Ambassador to India (2013)

Born in Slovenia in 1956, Darja Bavdaž Kuret graduated with a degree in political science and international relations from the University of Ljubljana. From 1995 to 1999, she was appointed Ambassador to Israel, including accreditation for the Palestinian Authority. She then headed the Department for Analysis and Planning at the Slovenian Ministry of Foreign Affairs before serving as Ambassador to Sweden, Finland, Estonia and Latvia (2002–2006). From 2006 to 2008, she was Secretary-General of the Bled Strategic Forum organized by the Slovenian Foreign Ministry and the Centre for European Perspective. In 2008, during Slovenia's presidency of the European Union, she served as Chair of the Capitals Working Group on Russia, Ukraine, Central Asia, Armenia, Azerbaijan, Georgia, Moldova, and Belarus.

From 2009 to 2013, Bavdaž Kuret was Ambassador to Hungary before serving as Ambassador to India (2013–2015, including accreditation for Bhutan, Bangladesh, Nepal and Sri Lanka (2014–2015)). She then returned to Slovenia where she was State Secretary from 2015 to 2017. In August 2017, she was appointed Permanent Representative of Slovenia to the UN General Assembly in New York. Bavdaž Kuret completed her post as Permanent Representative at the United Nations in June 2021. In September 2021 she was appointed Special Advisor to the Office of Abdulla Shahid, President of the 76th UN General Assembly.
