= Faculty of Social Sciences, Ljubljana =

Faculty of Social Sciences, University of Ljubljana
- Fakulteta za družbene vede, Univerza v Ljubljani
- Type: Public
- Established: 1961
- Dean: Iztok Prezelj
- Academic staff: 115 teaching and 96 research (2020/21)
- Location: Ljubljana, Slovenia
- Website: Official site

Faculty of Social Sciences (Slovene: Fakulteta za družbene vede; FDV) is one of the faculties, comprising the University of Ljubljana. It is located at Kardeljeva ploščad (Bežigrad District, Ljubljana).

The faculty is "the central Slovenian interdisciplinary, educational, scientific and research institution in the area of social sciences, and ranks among the biggest institutions of its kind in Europe." At the same time, is "one of the largest academic units of the University of Ljubljana with 27 graduate and postgraduate programmes in political science, communication, journalism, and cultural studies. Currently, it is also the largest public teaching and research institution in Slovenia, devoted to interdisciplinary studies.

Faculty was established in 1961 as the "College of Political Sciences" (Visoka šola za politične vede, VŠPV), which was in 1968 renamed into the "College of Sociology, Political Sciences and Journalism" (Visoka šola za sociologijo, politične vede in novinarstvo; VŠSPN). Two years later (in 1970), the college became part of the University of Ljubljana and was reorganized into the "Faculty of Sociology, Political Sciences and Journalism" (Fakulteta za sociologijo, politične vede in novinarstvo; FSPN). In 1991, the faculty was once more renamed as "Faculty of Social Sciences" (Fakulteta za družbene vede; FDV).

== History ==
Main building of the FDV

College of Political Sciences (Visoka šola za politične vede, VŠPV) was established on 31 January 1961 and on 2 October of the same year it officially opened. The primary mission of the newly-formed college was to provide educated cadre for the League of Communists of Slovenia, and thus "to help control the society and state".

At that time, the teaching staff were organized in four chairs: of philosophy and sociology, of economics, of social-political system and of international relations. In the first study year (1961/62), there were 31 regular and 48 extraordinary studenty at the 2nd level.

In 1963, the first chair of Journalism, headed by France Vreg, was formed, which was at that time also the first such study program in whole Yugoslavia. In the same year, the college started to offer also postgraduate program (master's degree in political science). The official start of journalism study is in the study year of 1964/65.

In 1963, a student dorm was built above the building of VŠPV with around 280 beds for students. Due to the fact, that this was only the second co-ed student dorm in Ljubljana and that was located by the VŠPV, it was nicknamed Marx's Brothel (Marxov bordel). In 2001, the dorm was evicted, demolished in 2003-04 and then in 2006, the new dorm was built.

Three years later, in 1966, first research centers were formed in the college. Next year (1967), a new master's degree was offered - in sociology. In 1968, the college was renamed into the College of Sociology, Political Science and Journalism (Visoka šola za sociologijo, politične vede in novinarstvo; VŠSPVN).

In 1968, the Public Opinion Center (current name: Public Opinion and Mass Communication Research Centre) was formed as part of the college.

Already in 1970, the college became a member of the University of Ljubljana (the 10th member of the University), and was at the same time reorganized into the Faculty of Sociology, Political Science and Journalism (Fakulteta za sociologijo, politične vede in novinarstvo; FSPVN). In 1974, a new study program was introduced - "General People's Defence and Societal selfprotection" (splošna ljudska obramba in družbena samozaščita), which was later developed into defence studies. In 1975, four FSPN professors (Vladimir Arzenšek, Tine Hribar, Janez Jerovšek and Veljko Rus) were removed from their teaching positions, because of their liberal views and for not including in their works more emphasis on Marxism, wrongly defined self-management and neglected the revolutionary role of the working class.

By 1986, the faculty had five study programs: sociology (with three disciplines), political science (with two disciplines), journalism, self-management with foundations of Marxism and defence studies.

In 1991, the Institute of Sociology (until then independent organization) merged with the Research Institute FSPN into the Social Sciences Research Institute. In the same year, the faculty is renamed into the Faculty of Social Sciences (Fakulteta za družbene vede; FDV).

In 1995, the FDV Publishing House was formed and in 1997 also the Social Science Data Archive (Arhiv družboslovnih podatkov; ADP).

In 2005, the faculty started to offer first Bologna Process study programs.

== Study ==
Currently, faculty is offering these study programs:

1st level (bachelor degrees)

- Social Informatics
- Communication Studies - Media and Communication Studies
- Communication Studies - Marketing Communication and Public Relations
- Cultural Studies – Studies of Cultures and Creativity
- International Relations
- Journalism
- Defence Studies
- Political Science – Public Policies and Administration
- Political Science – Studies of Politics and the State
- Sociology
- Sociology - Human Resources Management

2nd level (master's degrees)

- Social Informatics (offered in English)
- European Studies (offered in English)
- Communication Studies - Media and Communication Studies
- Cultural Studies
- International Relations (offered in English)
- Journalism
- Defence and Security Studies
- Political Science – Political Theory, Global and Strategic Studies (offered in English)
- Political Science – Comparative Studies of Politics and Administration
- Sociology
- Sociology - Human Resources, Knowledge and Organisational Management
- Marketing Communication and Public Relations

Interdisciplinary 2nd level (master's programs)

- Applied Statistics

Joint and Double Degrees Study Programmes

- European Master’s Degree in Human Rights and Democratisation (E.MA)

3rd level (Ph.D.)

- Interdisciplinary Doctoral Programme The Humanities and Social Sciences
  - American Studies
  - Balkan Studies
  - Communication Sciences
  - Cultural Studies
  - Defence Studies
  - Developmental Studies
  - Diplomacy
  - Environmental and Spatial Studies
  - Epistemology of the Humanities and Social Sciences
  - Ethnic and Migration Studies
  - European Studies
  - Gender Studies
  - Globalisation Studies
  - Human Resources and Organisational Studies
  - International Relations
  - Journalism Studies
  - Life Course Studies
  - Marketing Communication
  - Media Studies
  - Military Sociology Studies
  - Policy Analysis
  - Political Science
  - Psychology of Communication
  - Public Administration
  - Public Relations
  - Religious Studies
  - Security Studies
  - Social and Political Anthropology
  - Social and Political Psychology
  - Social Informatics
  - Social Sciences Methodology
  - Sociology
  - Studies of Everyday Life

Doctoral programmes organised at the university level

- Environmental Protection
- Statistics

== Organization ==
Currently, the Faculty has the following departments and chairs:

- Department of Sociology

- Chair of Theoretical Sociology
- Chair for Organizational and Human Resource Management and Development
- Chair of Social Informatics and Methodology

- Department of Political Science

- Chair of Theoretical Political Science
- Chair of Policy Analysis and Public Administration
- Chair of International Relations
- Chair of Defence Studies

- Department of Communication

- Chair of Media Studies
- Chair of Journalism
- Chair of Marketing Communications and Public Relations

- Department of Cultural Studies

- Chair of Cultural Studies

- Chairs at the faculty level

- Chair of foreign languages

== People ==
=== Teaching staff ===
In the school year of 2020/21, 115 university teachers were employed at the faculty.

Among the most prominent teachers in the history of the faculty are:

- Aleš Debeljak (1961-2016), poet, writer, editor, sociologist of culture
- Pavel Gantar (1949-), former speaker of the Slovenian National Assembly (2008–11)
- Ljubica Jelušič (1960-), former minister of defence (2008–12) (Chair of Defense Studies)
- Manca Košir (1948-), journalist, politician (Chair of Journalism)
- Igor Lukšič (1961-), former minister of education and sport (2008–12), former president of the Social Democrats (2012–14) (Chair of Political Sciences)
- Anton Grizold (1956-), former minister of defence (2000–02) (Chair of Defense Studies)

=== Graduates ===
By the study year 2020/21, 13,909 people completed bachelor programs, 50 completed specialized programs, 3,073 completed master study programs (of those 1,534 completed pre-Bologna scientific master programs) and 490 people completed doctoral programs.

Among the most prominent graduates of the faculty are:

- Darja Bavdaž Kuret (1956-), diplomat (ambassador)
- Urška Bračko (1993-), photomodel
- Alenka Bratušek, former Prime Minister of Slovenia (2013–14)
- Mihael Brejc, former Member of the European Parliament (2004–09), former Minister of Labour, Family and Social Affairs (2000)
- Milan Brglez, former speaker of the Slovenian National Assembly (2014–18), Member of the European Parliament (2019–24)
- Pavel Gantar (1949-), former speaker of the Slovenian National Assembly (2008–11)
- Klemen Grošelj, Member of the European Parliament (2019–24)
- Spomenka Hribar, author, philosopher, sociologist, politician
- Janez Janša, former Prime Minister of Slovenia (2003–08; 2012–13; 2020-22), former Minister of Defense (1990–94; 2000)
- Marjetka Jeršek (1961-), writer and painter
- Darja Kapš (1981-), Woman Grandmaster (Chess)
- Mojca Kleva (1976-), Member of the European Parliament (2011–14)
- Jožef Školč (1960-), former speaker of the Slovenian National Assembly (1994–96)
- Igor Šoltes (1964-), Member of the European Parliament (2014–19)
- Alojz Šteiner (1957-), Chief of Generalstaff of the Slovenian Armed Forces (2009–12)
- Gregor Tomc (1952-), musician and politician
- Matej Tonin (1983-), former minister of defence (2020-21), former speaker of the Slovenian National Assembly (2018)

== Publishing and journals ==
- Javnost-The Public
- Journal of Comparative Politics
- Journal of International Relations and Development
- Metodološki zvezki (Advances in Methodology and Statistics)
- Teorija in praksa
