= Cognitive social structures =

Focus of social network research

Cognitive social structures (CSS) is the focus of research that investigates how individuals perceive their own social structure (e.g. members of an organization, friend group, hierarchy, company employees, etc.). It is part of social network research and uses social network analysis to understand how various factors affect one's cognitive representation of the network (i.e. the individual's belief of who is connected to whom). Importantly, an individual's perception of the network may be different than reality. In fact, these differences between the perceived network and the actual network are the focus of many studies that seek insight into how we think about others and our relationships.

== Overview ==
In 1987, David Krackhardt discussed the study of cognitive social structures in an article that defined the term and outlined its uses in social network research. Social structures are defined by a set of individual members and the relations between those members. The study of cognitive social structures also includes every member's understanding of the social structure. Thus, a cognitive social structure consisting of n people has n separate, and possibly distinct, representations of that social structure.

Example: Alice, Bob, and Charlie are all friends. Thus, there are three separate representations of their network. If they each believe they are friends with the other two, but that the other two are not friends, then all three representations are distinct. That is, none of them agree on the structure of their friendship network. If, on the other hand, they all believed they were all friends, then they would all have the same representation of the network.

Furthermore, the perceived structure of the network and the actual structure of the network may be inconsistent. By measuring every member's perception of the network, researchers can analyze the systematic errors to understand how we think about networks and what affects these perceptions.

A network may consist of directed relations. A directed relation involves a sender and a receiver. For example, the relation “goes to for advice” is directed in that if Alice (sender) goes to Bob (receiver) for advice, it does not mean that Bob also goes to Alice for advice. The relation, "is a sibling of", on the other hand, is symmetric, not directed, because if Alice is a sibling of Bob, then Bob is necessarily a sibling of Alice.

=== Terminology ===
- Broker: A member who connects those who would otherwise be unconnected.
- Centrality: Influence measured by number of connections and distance from others with high centrality
  - Eigenvector centrality: How well connected an individual is to other well-connected members
- Closure/Balance: Given a member who is directly connected to two others, the triad is balanced if the other two are also connected

Alice is friends with Bob and Charlie. The triad is said to be balanced if Bob and Charlie are also friends. It is unbalanced if Bob and Charlie are not friends.

- Degree: The number of direct connections
  - In-degree: The number of ties directed towards the person
  - Out-degree: The number of directed ties from the person to others

Alice goes to Bob and Charlie for advice. Bob goes to Alice for advice. Alice has in-degree 1, and out-degree 2.

- Geodesic Distance: The shortest path between two individuals

Alice is friends with Bob who is friends with Charlie who is friends with David. The geodesic distance between Alice and Bob is one, between Alice and Charlie is two, and between Alice and David is three.

- Homophily: How similar an individual is to those directly connected to them
- Reciprocity/Mutuality: Given a directed relation from person A to person B, whether or not there is also a directed relation from person B to person A.

Alice goes to Bob for advice. This relationship is reciprocal if Bob also goes to Alice for advice.

== Analyzing Cognitive Social Structures ==
=== Ego Network Analysis ===
An ego network, or a local structure, consists of the individual and every member who is directly connected to that individual. For example, on social media, a user's ego network consists of the user (ego), everyone who is directly linked to that user's account (e.g. "friends" or "followers"), and the connections between those people (e.g. whether or not they are "friends" with or "followers" of each other). In an experiment, an ego network is measured by asking the participant to list everybody to whom they are directly connected, and then note which of those people are connected to each other. Thus, in an experimental setting, the ego network reflects the participant's view of their local network, and therefore may differ from another's participant's perspective.

=== Full Network Analysis ===
There are three primary methods used to examine a full cognitive social structure: slices (the individual perceptions of the full network), locally aggregated structures (the combination of each member's direct connections), and consensus structures (the network of relations that more than a certain portion of members agree on).

==== Slices ====
One way to analyze a cognitive social structure is to individually look at each “slice”, that is, each member's perception. Biases in network perception may shift based on the individual (e.g. personality) or the position (e.g. popular, low status). Comparing slices reveals differences between individuals as well as systematic errors in perception across members.

==== Locally Aggregated Structures (LAS) ====
One approach to studying a cognitive social structure is to measure each member's direct connections (ego networks). In other words, ask each individual to report who they are related to (e.g. friends with) in the network. That is, consider the individual's own relationships. Then connect all of these local networks to form the whole network. Building a network model in this way can be achieved by asking individuals who they relate to (e.g. “Who do you go to for advice?”), known as a Row Dominated Locally Aggregated Structure, or who is related to them (e.g. “Who goes to you for advice?”), known as a Column Dominated Locally Aggregated Structure.

There are two ways to combine local structures into the full locally aggregated structure. Taking the intersection of the local networks results in a network in which relations exist if both members perceive it. In a friendship network, this means that a friendship only exists if both people consider the other a friend. The union of the local networks is a structure consisting of relations that at least one involved member perceives. In a friendship network, this is equivalent to saying a friendship exists between two people if at least one of them considers the other a friend.

==== Consensus Structures ====
The consensus structure of a cognitive social structure is the network that more than a certain number of people perceive. This is accomplished by fixing a threshold such that a relation is said to exist if and only if the proportion of members who perceive that relation is greater than the threshold. For example, setting the threshold to 0.5 means that the relation between two people exists if the majority of people believe it exists. Similarly, a relation between two people does not exist if a majority of people do not perceive it.

== Empirical Findings ==
Many species are able to represent social structures, yet humans are able to represent disproportionately large social structures (based on cortical thickness in the brain). Research suggests that this is, at least in part, due to the use of schemas. Schemas are a pre-established method of organizing and perceiving the world. Similar to a template, schemas provide a basic scaffolding that allow humans to make assumptions about a social structure without remembering every detail individually. This preserves neural resources, allowing for representation of larger structures. Some research suggests that a basic schema people utilize is based on small-world network properties. Namely, one tends to believe that their social network contains groups of people who are highly intraconnected, and that these groups, or clusters, are connected via short paths. Other work suggests that this is particularly true of one's own group, but not for others. For example, Alice likely believes that all of her friends are friends with each other, but other groups are not as connected.

In addition to making network representation efficient, schemas, as well as other biases, lead to systematic errors in network perception. These errors in individual and group perceptions has been the focus of much of the research related to cognitive social structures.

In research, a typical method of measuring cognitive social structures involves

(a) listing one’s direct ties, either in general or in terms of whom they’ve interacted with recently, or
(b) completing a table that lists all members in the rows and columns by checking off whom everyone is connected to.

=== Learning Networks ===
Specific factors have been shown to influence how easily and how well people are able to learn new networks. As discussed above, people use schemas to represent networks. It makes sense, therefore, that structures that are consistent with these schemas are easier to learn. Specifically, behavioral research suggests that individuals are better at learning networks that group members by positive relations (e.g. "liking") and divide groups by negative relations (e.g. "disliking"), individuals are better able to learn people who are at the extremes of a hierarchy, rather than in the middle, and larger networks are easier to remember if they are balanced (if one person is friends with two others, than those two are also friends). People are also better at remembering large networks if they include kin labels (e.g. "Mother", "Uncle", "Cousin", etc.) than if they do not.

=== Accuracy ===
Many researchers compare individuals’ cognitive social structures to the actual social structure in order to measure consistent errors, or biases, involved with cognitive social structures. While some research shows that individuals’ representations correlate with the aggregate group's representation, there are systematic errors that occur as a result of network position and individual differences.

Many researchers have studied the effects of and the perceptions of centrality, or how well connected one is within the network. Broadly, individuals tend to believe they have higher centrality (i.e. better connected within the network) and higher degree (e.g. more friends) than others believe. Furthermore, members who have low centrality, such as those who are on the periphery of the network or at the bottom of the hierarchy (unpopular, low status), tend to have more accurate representations than those who are more central (popular, high status).

Several studies suggest that social network representations track overall patterns of behavior, rather than specific events. Furthermore, there appears to be a trade-off between overall accuracy and specific event accuracy: those who remember details of a specific interaction tend to have less accurate representations of overall behavior patterns, while those with more accurate pattern representations have more trouble recalling event details. This can cause issues when studying cognitive social structures because, often, the only way to determine the true social network is by observing behavior. If, however, the researchers do not sufficiently observe the network, then the observed behavior may not be representative of the overall patterns of behavior. Some research suggests that people extract these patterns of behavior by tracking the frequency of interactions, assuming that the more frequently two people interact, the more likely they are connected. This leads to the belief that people are more connected than they actually are. In accordance with balance theory, people tend to believe that the missing relation in unbalanced groups (e.g. groups of three in which two members are connected to the third but are not connected themselves) actually exists, thereby believing the triad is balanced. This is especially true when considering triads that are very close to the individual and very distant, but not for members who are intermediately far away.

Beyond accuracy, research also highlights the importance of alignment in perception among partners. Thatchenkery and Piezunka (2025) highlight that is crucial whether collaborating firms are aligned in whether they perceive each other as competitor.

=== Neural Findings ===
Research indicates that the interpersonal relationships among people shaped the evolution of human brains. Neuroimaging work has identified specific regions in the brain that aid in network representation, many of which are included in the default mode network, and track network position properties, such as eigenvector centrality, brokerage, and popularity. That is, when participants see a network member's face, they automatically retrieve information about that person's network position, suggesting that this information is important in understanding that person.

Much of the research relating social networks to neural measures focuses on physical size and density of brain regions. Research shows that social network size correlates with brain volume in specific regions, including the amygdala and regions associated with the default mode network, which is thought to process information about others' thoughts and feelings.

=== Individual Differences ===
Studies on individual differences in cognitive social structures examine how individuals' traits affect their perceptions of social networks. Following are specific aspects of individuals that researchers have found influence cognitive social structures.

Need for closure, which refers to one's tendency to avoid ambiguity, has been shown to correlate with the number of ties that are perceived as transitive. That is, the higher one's need for closure, the more likely they are to perceive unbalanced groups as balanced. Additionally, people with high need for closure tend to cluster people by racial similarity in their representation of social networks.

Status, Power, Popularity: in real-world social networks, low-power members tend to have more accurate perceptions of social networks than high-power individuals, particularly regarding people who are distant to the perceiver. One study found that these low-power individuals with accurate network perceptions received more payoffs compared to other low-power members with less accurate perceptions. However, the benefits to low-status individuals with accurate network knowledge only held if other low-status people had worse knowledge. Similarly, in a controlled setting, participants primed with low-status then had more accurate representations of a social network, but not of a non-social network. This research suggests that one's own status is an important factor in their representation of their social networks, because high power prompts people to use heuristics, while low-power people use more systematic methods to understand the network.

There has been much research on how people perceive their social network and the differences between these perceptions. Other individual differences measures have been suggested to influence cognitive social structures, including need for achievement, need for affiliation, and self-monitoring. However, since studies often use different types of networks (e.g. real-world organizations, friend groups, communication networks), there is not yet consensus on the effect of these differences.

== See also ==
- Social network
- Social structure
- Social network analysis
- Collective network
- International Network for Social Network Analysis
- Network society
- Network theory
- Default mode network
- Social cognition
