= Social balance theory =

Class of theories

Social balance theory is a class of theories about balance or imbalance of sentiment relation in dyadic or triadic relations with social network theory. Sentiments can result in the emergence of two groups. Disliking exists between the two subgroups within liking agents.

== Development of the theory ==
This theory evolved over time to produce models more closely resembling real-world social networks. It uses a balance index to measure the effect of local balance on that of a global level and also on a more intimate level, like in interpersonal relationships. Dorwin Cartwright and Frank Harary introduced clustering to account for multiple social cliques. Davis introduced hierarchical clustering to account for asymmetric relations.

The topology and hubness of positive and negative links have been shown to significantly affect the structural balance of real-world signed networks. This property is explainable in terms of the high degree of skewness of the sign distributions on the nodes of the graph.

The dynamics of relationships have been modeled to explore the finite states of social networks, ranging from an idealized "paradise," where all links represent friendships, to social bipolarity. The energy landscape of social relationships has been conceptualized using interacting spin models, based on the contrast between balanced and imbalanced relationships in social networks. This framework has also been applied to the study of brain network dynamics, providing insights into the mechanisms underlying cognitive and brain systems and contributing to the development of improved neurobiomarkers.

== Features of the theory ==
=== 3 Relationship Types ===
Structural balance theory, proposed by the psychologist Fritz Heider in the 1940s, is a framework used to understand the dynamics of relationships within social networks. The theory focuses on the notion that individuals strive for consistency and harmony in their interpersonal relationships.

According to structural balance theory, relationships between individuals can be categorized into three types:

1. Positive (or balanced) relationships: These are relationships where all parties involved have mutual positive sentiments toward each other. For example, if A likes B and B likes C, then A should also like C to maintain balance.
2. Negative (or imbalanced) relationships: These are relationships where there is conflict or antagonism between individuals. For example, if A dislikes B and B dislikes C, then A should like C to restore balance.
3. Mixed relationships: These are relationships that are neither entirely positive nor entirely negative. They can create tension or discomfort within the social network until balance is achieved.

Structural balance theory suggests that individuals tend to seek and maintain balanced relationships within their social networks. When imbalances occur, individuals may adjust their relationships or perceptions to restore balance. This theory has been applied in various fields such as sociology, psychology, and computer science to study phenomena like group dynamics, social influence, and network stability.

=== 4 Rules ===
Structural balance theory posits that some types of triads are forbidden and others are permitted on the basis of four rules.

Using the term "friend" to designate a positive sentiment and the term "enemy" to designate a negative sentiment, the classic balance model defines a sentiment network as balanced if it contains no violations of four assumptions:

(A1) A friend of a friend is a friend,

(A2) A friend of an enemy is an enemy,

(A3) An enemy of a friend is an enemy,

(A4) An enemy of an enemy is a friend.

=== 16 Triad Types ===
The configuration of sentiments in each triad can be classified as one of 16 possible types.

The 16 types of triads that are possible in any group of three or more individuals are characterized by three numbers indicating the number of mutual (M), asymmetric (A), and null (N) ties, and symbols that discriminate triads with identical MAN numbers. These symbols include transitive (T), up (U), down (D), and cyclic (C) when required. Only two triads (300 and 102) do not violate any of the four rules, leading to the classic model's implication of united or bifurcated macrostructures (page 6).

Sources: p.6, p.9, p.15

== See also ==
- Balance theory
- Sociograms
