= Interpersonal ties =

Information-carrying connections between people

Nodes (individuals) and ties (connections) in social networks.

In social network analysis and mathematical sociology, interpersonal ties are defined as information-carrying connections between people. Interpersonal ties, generally, come in three varieties: strong, weak or absent. Weak social ties, it is argued, are responsible for the majority of the embeddedness and structure of social networks in society as well as the transmission of information through these networks. Specifically, more novel information flows to individuals through weak rather than strong ties. Because our close friends tend to move in the same circles that we do, the information they receive overlaps considerably with what we already know. Acquaintances, by contrast, know people that we do not, and thus receive more novel information.

Included in the definition of absent ties, according to the American sociologist Mark Granovetter, are those relationships (or ties) without substantial significance, such as "nodding" relationships between people living on the same street, or the "tie", for example, to a frequent vendor one would buy from. Such relations with familiar strangers have also been called invisible ties since they are hardly observable, and are often overlooked as a relevant type of ties. They nevertheless support people's sense of familiarity and belonging. Furthermore, the fact that two people may know each other by name does not necessarily qualify the existence of a weak tie. If their interaction is negligible the tie may be absent or invisible. The "strength" of an interpersonal tie is a linear combination of the amount of time, the emotional intensity, the intimacy (or mutual confiding), and the reciprocal services which characterize each tie.

== History ==
One of the earliest writers to describe the nature of the ties between people was German scientist and philosopher, Johann Wolfgang von Goethe. In his classic 1809 novella, Elective Affinities, Goethe discussed the "marriage tie". The analogy shows how strong marriage unions are similar in character to particles of quicksilver, which find unity through the process of chemical affinity.

In 1954, the Russian mathematical psychologist Anatol Rapoport commented on the "well-known fact that the likely contacts of two individuals who are closely acquainted tend to be more overlapping than those of two arbitrarily selected individuals". This argument became one of the cornerstones of social network theory.

In 1973, stimulated by the work of Rapoport and Harvard theorist Harrison White, Mark Granovetter published The Strength of Weak Ties. This paper is now recognized as one of the most influential sociology papers ever written.

To obtain data for his doctoral thesis, Granovetter interviewed dozens of people to find out how social networks are used to land new jobs. Granovetter found that most jobs were found through "weak" acquaintances. This pattern reminded Granovetter of his freshman chemistry lesson that demonstrated how "weak" hydrogen bonds hold together many water molecules, which are themselves composed of atoms held together by "strong" covalent bonds.

In Granovetter's view, a similar combination of strong and weak bonds holds the members of society together. This model became the basis of his first manuscript on the importance of weak social ties in human life, published in May 1973. According to Current Contents, by 1986, the Weak Ties paper had become a citation classic, being one of the most cited papers in sociology.

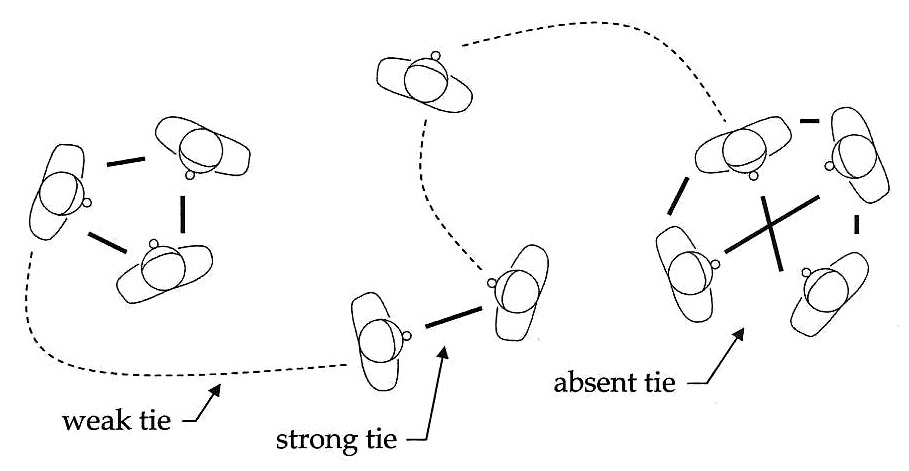

In a related line of research in 1969, anthropologist Bruce Kapferer, published "Norms and the Manipulation of Relationships in a Work Context" after doing field work in Africa. In the document, he postulated the existence of multiplex ties, characterized by multiple contexts in a relationship. In telecommunications, a multiplexer is a device that allows a transmission medium to carry a number of separate signals. In social relations, by extrapolation, "multiplexity" is the overlap of roles, exchanges, or affiliations in a social relationship.

== Research data ==
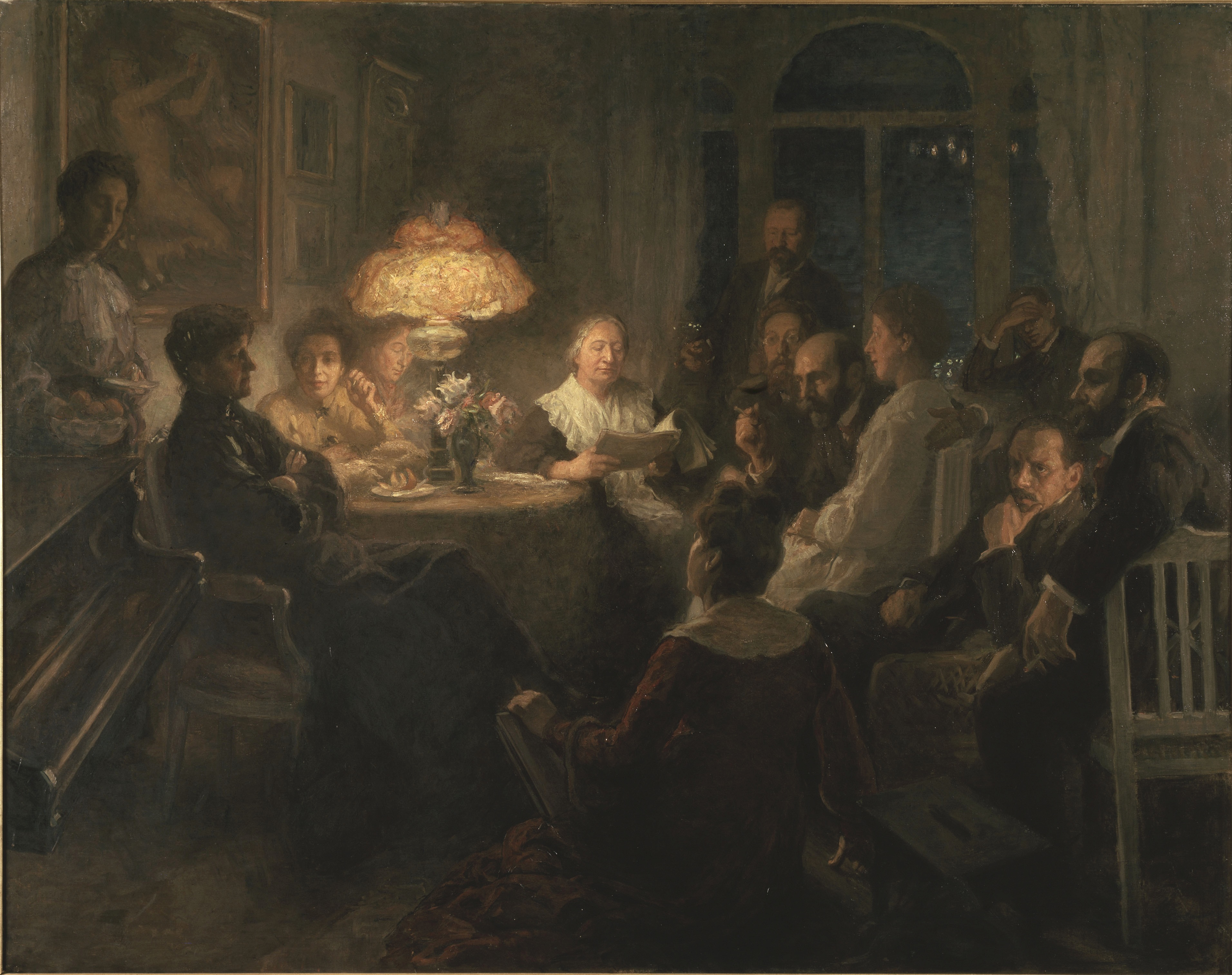
Friends, painting by Hanna Pauli

In 1970, Granovetter submitted his doctoral dissertation to Harvard University, entitled "Changing Jobs: Channels of Mobility Information in a Suburban Community". The thesis of his dissertation illustrated the conception of weak ties. For his research, Dr. Granovetter crossed the Charles River to Newton, Massachusetts where he surveyed 282 professional, technical, and managerial workers in total. 100 were personally interviewed, in regards to the type of ties between the job changer and the contact person who provided the necessary information. Tie strength was measured in terms of how often they saw the contact person during the period of the job transition, using the following assignment:

- often = at least once a week
- occasionally = more than once a year but less than twice a week
- rarely = once a year or less

Of those who found jobs through personal contacts (N=54), 16.7% reported seeing their contact often, 55.6% reported seeing their contact occasionally, and 27.8% rarely. When asked whether a friend had told them about their current job, the most frequent answer was "not a friend, an acquaintance". The conclusion from this study is that weak ties are an important resource in occupational mobility. When seen from a macro point of view, weak ties play a role in affecting social cohesion.

== Social networks ==
In social network theory, social relationships are viewed in terms of nodes and ties. Nodes are the individual actors within the networks, and ties are the relationships between the actors. There can be many kinds of ties between the nodes. In its simplest form, a social network is a map of all of the relevant ties between the nodes being studied.

=== Weak tie hypothesis ===
The "weak tie hypothesis" argues, using a combination of probability and mathematics, as originally stated by Anatol Rapoport in 1957, that if A is linked to both B and C, then there is a greater-than-chance probability that B and C are linked to each other:

That is, if we consider any two randomly selected individuals, such as A and B, from the set S = A, B, C, D, E, ..., of all persons with ties to either or both of them, then, for example, if A is strongly tied to both B and C, then according to probability arguments, the B–C tie is always present. The absence of the B–C tie, in this situation, would create, according to Granovetter, what is called the forbidden triad. In other words, the B–C tie, according to this logic, is always present, whether weak or strong, given the other two strong ties. In this direction, the "weak tie hypothesis" postulates that clumps or cliques of social structure will form, being bound predominately by "strong ties", and that "weak ties" will function as the crucial bridge between any two densely knit clumps of close friends.

It may follow that individuals with few bridging weak ties will be deprived of information from distant parts of the social system and will be confined to the provincial news and views of their close friends. However, having a large number of weak ties can mean that novel information is effectively "swamped" among a high volume of information, even crowding out strong ties. The arrangement of links in a network may matter as well as the number of links. Further research is needed to examine the ways in which types of information, numbers of ties, quality of ties, and trust levels interact to affect the spreading of information.

=== Strong ties hypothesis ===
According to David Krackhardt, there are some problems in the Granovetter definition. The first one refers to the fact that the Granovetter definition of the strength of a tie is a curvilinear prediction and his question is "how do we know where we are on this theoretical curve?". The second one refers to the effective character of strong ties. Krackhardt says that there are subjective criteria in the definition of the strength of a tie such as emotional intensity and the intimacy. He thought that strong ties are very important in severe changes and uncertainty:

"People resist change and are uncomfortable with uncertainty. Strong ties constitute a base of trust that can reduce resistance and provide comfort in the face of uncertainty. This it will be argued that change is not facilitated by weak ties, but rather by a particular type of strong tie."

He called this particular type of strong tie philo and define philos relationship as one that meets the following three necessary and sufficient conditions:

1. Interaction: For A and B to be philos, A and B must interact with each other.
2. Affection: For A and B to be philos, A must feel affection for B.
3. Time: A and B, to be philos, must have a history of interactions with each other that have lasted over an extended period of time.

The combination of these qualities predicts trust and predicts that strong ties will be the critical ones in generating trust and discouraging malfeasance. When it comes to major change, change that may threaten the status quo in terms of power and the standard routines of how decisions are made, then trust is required. Thus, change is the product of philos.

=== Positive ties and negative ties ===
Starting in the late 1940s, Anatol Rapoport and others developed a probabilistic approach to the characterization of large social networks in which the nodes are persons and the links are acquaintanceship. During these years, formulas were derived that connected local parameters such as closure of contacts, and the supposed existence of the B–C tie to the global network property of connectivity.

Moreover, acquaintanceship (in most cases) is a positive tie. However, there are also negative ties such as animosity among persons. In considering the relationships of three, Fritz Heider initiated a balance theory of relations. In a larger network represented by a graph, the totality of relations is represented by a signed graph.

This effort led to an important and non-obvious Structure Theorem for signed graphs, which was published by Frank Harary in 1953. A signed graph is called balanced if the product of the signs of all relations in every cycle is positive. A signed graph is unbalanced if the product is ever negative. The theorem says that if a network of interrelated positive and negative ties is balanced, then it consists of two subnetworks such that each has positive ties among its nodes and negative ties between nodes in distinct subnetworks. In other words, "my friend's enemy is my enemy". The imagery here is of a social system that splits into two cliques. There is, however, a special case where one of the two subnetworks may be empty, which might occur in very small networks.

In these two developments, we have mathematical models bearing upon the analysis of the structure. Other early influential developments in mathematical sociology pertained to process. For instance, in 1952 Herbert A. Simon produced a mathematical formalization of a published theory of social groups by constructing a model consisting of a deterministic system of differential equations. A formal study of the system led to theorems about the dynamics and the implied equilibrium states of any group.

=== Absent or invisible ties ===
In a footnote, Mark Granovetter defines what he considers as absent ties:

Included in 'absent' are both the lack of any relationship and ties without substantial significance, such as a 'nodding' relationship between people living on the same street, or the 'tie' to the vendor from whom one customarily buys a morning newspaper. That two people 'know' each other by name need not move their relation out of this category if their interaction is negligible. In some contexts, however (disasters, for example), such 'negligible' ties might usefully be distinguished from non-existent ties. This is an ambiguity caused by substitution, for convenience of exposition, of discrete values for an underlying continuous variable.

The concept of invisible tie was proposed to overcome the contradiction between the adjective "absent" and this definition, which suggests that such ties exist and might "usefully be distinguished" from the absence of ties. From this perspective, the relationship between two familiar strangers, such as two people living on the same street, is not absent but invisible. Indeed, because such ties involve only limited interaction (as in the case of 'nodding relationships'), if any, they are hardly observable, and are often overlooked as a relevant type of ties. Absent or invisible ties nevertheless support people's sense of familiarity and belonging.

=== Latent tie ===
Adding any network-based means of communication such as a new IRC channel, a social support group, a Webboard lays the groundwork for connectivity between formerly unconnected others. Similarly, laying an infrastructure, such as the Internet, intranets, wireless connectivity, grid computing, telephone lines, cellular service, or neighborhood networks, when combined with the devices that access them (phones, cellphones, computers, etc.) makes it possible for social networks to form. Such infrastructures make a connection available technically, even if not yet activated socially. These technical connections support latent social network ties, used here to indicate ties that are technically possible but not yet activated socially. They are only activated, i.e. converted from latent to weak, by some sort of social interaction between members, e.g. by telephoning someone, attending a group-wide meeting, reading and contributing to a Webboard, emailing others, etc. Given that such connectivity involves unrelated persons, the latent tie structure must be established by an authority beyond the persons concerned. Internet-based social support sites contain this profile. These are started by individuals with a particular interest in a subject who may begin by posting information and providing the means for online discussion.

== The individualistic perspective ==
Granovetter's 1973 work proved to be crucial in the individualistic approach of the social network theory as seen by the number of references in other papers. His argument asserts that weak ties or "acquaintances", are less likely to be involved within the social network than strong ties (close friends and family). By not going further in the strong ties, but focusing on the weak ties, Granovetter highlights the importance of acquaintances in social networks. He argues, that the only thing that can connect two social networks with strong ties is a weak tie: "… these clumps / [strong ties networks] would not, in fact, be connected to one another at all were it not for the existence of weak ties.

It follows that in an all-covering social network individuals are at a disadvantage with only a few weak links, compared to individuals with multiple weak links, as they are disconnected with the other parts of the network. Another interesting observation that Granovetter makes in his work is the increasing specialization of individuals creates the necessity for weak ties, as all the other specialist information and knowledge is present in large social networks consisting predominately of weak ties.

Cross et al., (2001) confirm this by presenting six features which differentiate effective and ineffective knowledge sharing relations: "1)knowing what other person knows and thus when to turn to them; 2) being able to gain timely access to that person; 3) willingness of the person sought out to engage in the problem solving rather than dump information; 4) a degree of safety in the relationship that promoted learning and creativity; 5) the factors put by Geert Hofstede; and 6) individual characteristics, such as openness" (pp 5). This fits in nicely with Granovetter's argument that "Weak ties provide people with access to information and resources beyond those available in their own social circle; but strong ties have greater motivation to be of assistance and are typically more easily available."

This weak/strong ties paradox is elaborated by myriad authors. The extent in which individuals are connected to others is called centrality. Sparrowe & Linden (1997) argue how the position of a person in a social network confer advantages such organizational assimilation, and job performance (Sparrowe et al., 2001); Burt (1992) expects it to result in promotions, Brass (1984) affiliates centrality with power and Friedkin (1993) with influence in decision power. Other authors, such as Krackhardt and Porter (1986) contemplate the disadvantages of the position is social networks such as organizational exit (see also Sparrowe et al., 2001) and Wellman et al.,(1988) introduce the use of social networks for emotional and material support. Blau and Fingerman, drawing from these and other studies, refer to weak ties as consequential strangers, positing that they provide some of the same benefits as intimates as well as many distinct and complementary functions.

== Labour market ==
In the early 1990s, US social economist James D. Montgomery contributed to economic theories of network structures in the labour market. In 1991, Montgomery incorporated network structures in an adverse selection model to analyze the effects of social networks on labour market outcomes. In 1992, Montgomery explored the role of "weak ties", which he defined as non-frequent and transitory social relations in the labour market. He demonstrated that weak ties are positively correlated with higher wages and higher aggregate employment rates.

== See also ==
- Dependent origination
- Human bonding
- Six degrees of separation
- Bridge (interpersonal)
- Simmelian tie
- Social connection
- Signed graph – Graph with sign-labeled edges
