= Pardus (video game) =

2004 video game

- Developers: Bayer&Szell OG
- Publishers: Bayer&Szell OG
- Platform: Web browser
- Release: September 14, 2004
- Genre: MMORPG space simulation browser game
- Mode: Multiplayer

Pardus is a graphical browser-based MMORPG written in PHP and C/C++ and set in a futuristic universe where players interact and compete in space. It is a persistent-universe, open-ended game with a player-driven economy. Players travel through hundreds of "sectors" or solar systems while trading, building or battling with non-player characters (NPCs) and other players. There are dozens of spacecraft models in Pardus, which can be customized with different weapons, armor and other equipment. Pardus characters do not have a defined 'class'.

Partially inspired by classic computer games such as Elite and Master of Orion II, Pardus was developed and published by the Austrian company Bayer&Szell OG. Alpha testing of the game began in September 2004 and the core feature set was finished by October 1, 2006.

== Background ==
The main navigation screen

Pardus is set in a technologically advanced but war-torn universe. Players begin the game with a low-end spacecraft and attempt to increase their wealth, rank, skills and otherwise advance their characters. Players may optionally join factions and syndicates for rank-based rewards, or they may choose to build their wealth by developing trade routes or constructing buildings or starbases that produce commodities. Some players make a living smuggling contraband goods or pirating and raiding other players and their buildings, or bounty hunting. In the Pardus Cluster a NPC faction, the Lucidi, rule supreme.

There are three different servers, or "universes", on which a player may create characters, one character per universe. One of these servers is reserved for Premium subscribers. Using more than one account by a player is forbidden, a rule which is strictly enforced.

=== Races ===
Upon completion of the tutorial a player must choose from one of four races: Humans, Rashkir, Ska'ari or Keldon. Each race has a specialization bonus of skills, ship and/or equipment, as well as a starting location appropriate to their species.

=== Factions ===
Factions are an important part of the game. There are three factions in the Pardus universe: the Empire, the Federation, and the Union. Each faction has a certain set of specializations, which gives member pilots access to unique ships and equipment. The two original factions and their ranks are heavily influenced by the Elite video game.

- Empire

The Empire is one of the two ancestral factions consisting of mostly Ska'ari and Keldon. The first faction to exist, the Empire is wealthy and powerful. The Empire specializes in gun and missile based weapon systems. Its guns are more advanced than other conventional weapon types, and its missiles outshoot and outthink all others in the universe. The Empire controls the southern part of the Pardus universe, as well has six sectors in the Pardus Cluster. The Empire's rank structure has the feel of a feudal monarchy.

- Federation

The Federation is the other of the two ancestral factions consisting largely of Humans and Rashkir. The second faction to come into existence, the Federation slowly formed as pilots looked to fight the Empire. The Federation specializes in ship construction and ship drives. Most Federation ships and drives have some design advantages over their neutral and other-faction counterparts. The Federation also has a faction specialist, the missile technician, who boosts the intelligence of its captain's missiles. The federation controls the region of space in the north-west part of the Pardus universe, as well as seven sectors in the Pardus Cluster. The Federation's rank structure has the feel of a regimented military system.

- Union

The Union is the newest faction consisting of mainly Keldon and Rashkir. During its initial development, many former Empire and Federation pilots left to tap this new territory. The Union was formed by "Mad" Max Sheppard who was a trader – selling arms to both the Federation and the Empire during the Second Great War. The Union's original aim was to extend the fighting between the Federation and the Empire in order to profit by selling arms to both factions. The Union is now well established as an independent faction. The Union specializes in shields, armor and illegal special equipment such as advanced countermeasures. The Union controls the north-eastern part of the Pardus universe, including seven sectors in the Pardus Cluster. The Union rank structure has the feel of an organized crime family.

Each faction controls clusters and a smaller Pardus contingent cluster. There are also many neutral (officially) clusters throughout the universe, many of which serve as buffer areas between faction clusters, but a starbase build by a player belonging to a faction exerts a certain amount of influence both economically and militarily.

Players interactions are key to factions and is promoted by the game. Often on developed servers, cooperation within factions are highly organized. Decisions are often made by players of the biggest and/or most influential faction-affiliated alliances. The level of cooperation is such that on certain servers, the borders of some faction-controlled territory are sealed by military outposts (controlled by players) that prevent foes or unwanted guests from passing. This requires coordination of dozens of players, as the number of buildings each player can build is severely limited.

=== Syndicates ===
There are two Syndicates which generally represent opposed ends of the lawful/lawless spectrum. To join either syndicate, the players must meet the reputation requirements of the syndicate. Syndicates are generally smaller than factions and do not claim territories. Each syndicate provides to its members access to unique ships and equipment, as well as daily reputation bonuses (positive or negative).

- Esteemed Pilots Syndicate (EPS)

The Esteemed Pilots Syndicate is the syndicate of order and lawfulness, created as a response to the formation of TSS. Members can also be a member of any one faction, though the effect of reputation may kick the member from EPS during a war in which the pilot's faction is involved. EPS membership is public, with list of members accessible on every planet and EPS members' ships clearly marked. Ex-members may not join TSS while piloting an EPS ship.

- The Shadow Syndicate (TSS)

The Shadow Syndicate is the syndicate of chaos and lawlessness, formed as the Union became an official and more lawful faction. TSS membership is secret, which means there is no definite way of identifying a TSS pilot and there is no list of members. TSS members may not join a faction, and ex-members may not join a faction or EPS while piloting a TSS ship.

== Basic gameplay ==
Pardus is browser-based and requires no downloads to play. From the main interface players have a view of the local system they are in, plus various screens detailing the buildings in the area, the contents of their ship, the skills of their character and so forth.

All players must complete a tutorial before beginning the game. Though the main game is in English and using languages other than English for communication in open channels is forbidden, the tutorial is also available in Dutch, German, Hungarian, Indonesian, Italian, Polish, Portuguese, Finnish, and Spanish. For the duration of the tutorial and a period of time after, a player has access to "Help Chat", in which experienced players make themselves available to assist newer players with problems or questions about the game.

A critically important aspect of the game is the Action Point system. Any interaction with the game world requires Action Points (or APs) to be spent, which regenerate at a rate of 24 APs every 6 minutes throughout the day, up to a maximum of 5000 stored APs. This prevents players who stay in the game all day from gaining a significant advantage over people who only log in once or twice a day for a short time. There are certain skills and in-game items which grant a limited number of extra APs, and players with a Premium Account may accumulate up to 5500 APS instead of 5000.

There are several ways to directly improve a player's character in the game. One of the most common ways is trading, which involves buying commodities and transporting them to another area where they can be sold for a higher price, often benefiting the area as a whole. Fighting NPCs improves a character's various combat attributes. Collecting raw resources improves collecting skills, and practicing hacking or cloaking enables a player to better perform those actions in the future.

=== Ships and equipment ===
There are dozens of ship models available in Pardus, but only one ship is used by a character at any one time. Each ship may be outfitted with various weapons, shields and other equipment. Ships and equipment available to a player depend on the player's faction or syndicate, faction rank, competency level and experience points. Ship and equipment choice depends on what the player intends to use it for, fighting, trading, or a mix of both.

=== Combat ===
Combat in Pardus is turn-based; the player chooses how many rounds to battle against an opponent. The number of hits and damage per hit each round is based on the combat skills and equipment of the character. Luck also plays an important role in combat. Some NPCs may hold a player for additional rounds of combat after a player tries to retreat. The chance of being held and the number of additional combat rounds depends on the type of NPC.

=== Economy ===
A variety of resources, NPCs and player buildings (Rigel, Pardus Empire Contingent)

The economy in Pardus is dynamic and relies mostly on player actions. Several times each day at fixed intervals all planets, starbases and buildings in the game consume and produce a variety of commodities, provided certain upkeep needs are met. There are dozens of types of commodities available, ranging from low-tech raw materials such as Food, Water, Energy, Ore, and Metal, to high-end finished products such as Droids and Hand Weapons. Several illegal commodities, such as slaves, drugs, and body parts also exist.

==== Extracting raw materials ====
Raw materials can be harvested in space. Each tile, or "field", has a raw material associated with it; for example, open space contains hydrogen fuel, and asteroid fields contain ore. Each field holds a maximum of 500 units (tons) of its respective material, but the more a field is harvested, the slower the field regenerates, and the less can be harvested from the field unless it is given sufficient time to regenerate. This often leads to fields that are "strip-mined", meaning raw materials are very scarce or in insufficient quantities to be harvested. Strip-mined fields are one of the most common difficulties encountered by players in the more populated areas of the universe. Also, players who strip-mine may find themselves an enemy of other pilots.

==== Constructing buildings ====
Players can construct a variety of buildings, in order to produce commodities associated with that building. Buildings produce and consume commodities every six hours, a process known as "ticking". The commodities consumed and produced in a building depend on the type of building. Improving building's Production Level increases the output, but also the efficiency of production. Players may stock their own buildings, or they may leave their buildings open to trade with other players; likewise, they may collect the produced goods themselves or leave those goods for sale for other players to consider purchasing.

Buildings are classified as "Low-level" (including asteroid mines and fuel collectors), "Mid-level" (including Electronics Facilities and Breweries), and "High-level" (including Hand Weapons Factories and Military Outposts). Each have their own initial start-up costs and their unique necessary upkeep, some high-end buildings require a certain amount of experience or APs played before construction is allowed.

A few buildings, such as Drug Stations and Dark Domes, though lucrative, will cause the player reputation loss if built, with additional reputation losses if they are built in faction space. This reputation loss is often used by pirates to easily gain acceptance into The Shadow Syndicate and enjoy relevant benefits.

Buildings can be raided by other players, which prompts owners to install building defenses to secure their business. These defense modules need to be destroyed before commodities can be stolen and allows the owner and his allies time to react to the attack. Undefended buildings can be damaged and eventually destroyed with subsequent attacks. Damaged buildings can be repaired by their owner.

==== Starbases ====
View of the inner starbase surrounded by players with bomber and fighter squadrons

Starbases are important trade centers in areas where no planets are to be found and are important part of the economy in Pardus. Player-owned starbases, though generally more difficult to maintain than other buildings, can make their owners a considerable amount of money if well placed. Some successful bases tend to have private web pages with extended customer services, marketing, RP elements and/or investor programs.

An important function of starbases is providing players with a place to repair their vessels, provided the starbase owner builds a repair facility onto it. Starbases may also produce spacecraft and equipment, which the owner may then sell to other players. This is a popular function, as player-built ships and equipment is usually considerably cheaper than their regular price offered by NPC starbases and planets. Unlike other buildings, starbases may be transferred to another player or conquered by force. Starbases also play a key role in faction wars, especially in the Pardus contingents.

==== Trading and missions ====
The basic method of obtaining wealth in Pardus is trading. Players buy goods from a planet, starbase or building, then travel to another to sell it in a "buy low-sell high" fashion. Many players establish trade routes between certain buildings which they maintain regularly. NPC starbases and planets have dynamic pricing which adjusts the commodity price according to the supply.

Planets and starbases hold randomly generated missions that replenish as soon as they are completed by players. The bulletin boards offering these missions refresh two times a day. There is a variety of missions; for instance killing non-player characters (NPCs), delivering packages, or transporting VIPs. When a mission is completed successfully, the player receives a reward of credits (the in-game money); if the mission was a faction mission, the player will receive an amount of rank increase, or if the mission was a neutral (non-faction) mission, the player will receive an amount of "competency" instead. As competency level or faction rank increases, more difficult and rewarding missions will become available. There are also special faction missions available only during times of war. EPS members have 67% more neutral missions available to them than other pilots.

==== Raiding, piracy, bounty hunting and smuggling ====
A player does not have to be a legal trader, and can earn money through combat or illegal trade. With the proper equipment, a player may raid another player's spacecraft or building, a sometimes quite profitable exercise. Some players take pirating to an extreme and attempt to destroy anyone they can; these pirates often get bountied. A bounty can be placed on any player or building by the system or by other players. If a player kills a bountied player or destroys a bountied building, they will automatically receive the sum of all bounties that were placed on that particular individual or that building.

Smuggling is a risky but often profitable venture. Illegal commodities may be sold to other players or to the black market available on any planet or a starbase with a population over 30,000. There is a chance a player will be detected by the authorities when selling to a black market, however, which might result in a faction bounty. EPS pilots may have equipment that can detect illegal contraband on ships and will turn players over to authorities.

== Player interaction ==
An important aspect of Pardus is interaction between players. Most players join a faction and one of the many player-made alliances, which range from just a few members to hundreds. Chat channels and forums are available for trading, alliance discussions, and other topics. Players often plan economies together in order to produce maximum profits, build Military Outpost "walls", and can attack or ambush targets together that they would not be able to defeat alone.

=== PvP combat ===
Player versus player (PvP) combat is frequent in Pardus. Like combat with an NPC, PvP combat is turn-based. Players may also set ambushes that are triggered by other players, even if the ambusher is offline. PvP combat is particularly intense during faction wars. Alliances can also declare a Private Conflict on each other. PvP killing not associated with faction war, private conflict, or bounty hunting is always considered piracy.

=== Alliances ===
There are also player-made alliances in Pardus; many alliances claim a section of space by building a blockade of military outposts (which are able to be equipped with defenses not available to other buildings). The players and their buildings behind the outposts are then safe from all but the most determined attackers.

Alliances come in two versions, Veiled and Disclosed.

- Disclosed

Disclosed alliances cannot accept TSS members. EPS members are only able to join alliances that are disclosed. Disclosed alliances may have a faction alignment, and if so, all members must be of that faction.

- Veiled

Veiled alliances cannot accept EPS members. TSS members are only able to join alliances that are veiled. Veiled alliances may not have a faction alignment, in the same way that TSS members cannot be a member of a faction.

== Premium subscriptions ==
Three spacecraft cautiously exploring the Pardus Sector

As of October 1, 2006, Pardus implemented premium subscriptions which give players access to new features and areas unavailable to non-paying players, plus a premium-only server. Available Premium periods are 30, 90, 180, and 360 days. A 10-day Premium trial is also offered to players free of charge once their character uses their 1 millionth AP.

Premium subscriptions give access to three Pardus contingent clusters, with a total of 20 sectors, each owned by one of the factions, and the unique central Pardus sector. Contingent cluster sectors are providing benefits to players belonging to the owning faction. Unlike regular faction territory their ownership can change based on player activities. Only the central Pardus cluster, offering unique NPC opponents and additional rules, remains neutral at all times.

Players may also get a free Premium subscription with the Pardus "referral program".

== Awards ==
Pardus won the Best Free Online RPG award in the 2005 Online Game Awards held by GameOgre.

== Social networking research ==
By collecting anonymous data from users Pardus has been used in social networking research, with particular attention to positive versus negative relationships with other players and how those relationships impact behavior and other interactions.

Though certainly not unique in collecting electronic user data, Pardus is particularly useful for studying social interactions and complex networks due to the unusual depth of the social networking information collected in the game. Because Pardus is player-driven and open-ended, it acts similarly to agent-based models, with the important distinction of the "agents" being real people instead of programmed. By tracking how relationships, positive or negative, evolve and impact the Pardus society on micro and macro scales, researchers have been able to validate a long-standing social psychology theory known as social balance theory.

Funding for the research includes the Engineering and Physical Sciences Research Council and the Austrian Science Fund.
