= Dorothy Dinnerstein =

Feminist activist and author

Dorothy Dinnerstein (April 4, 1923 – December 17, 1992) was an American academic and feminist activist, best known for her 1976 book The Mermaid and the Minotaur. Drawing from elements of Sigmund Freud's psychoanalysis, particularly as developed by Melanie Klein, Dinnerstein argued that sexism and aggression were both inevitable consequences of child rearing being left exclusively to women. As a solution, Dinnerstein proposed that men and women equally share infant and child care responsibilities. Her theories were not widely accepted at the time they were published. Dorothy Dinnerstein was a feminist, expressing her position by stating that “it's easier for women than for men to see what's wrong with the world that men have run".

== Early life and education ==
Born on April 4, 1923 in the Bronx, Dinnerstein was raised in a Jewish community and was raised by her parents, Nathan Dinnerstein and Celia Moedboth, both progressive Jews.

Nathan Dinnerstein was an architectural engineer and Celia Moedboth worked in administration at the Bronx Family Court. Unfortunately, Nathan's architectural engineer business did not survive the depression. He found a job keeping the books at Mott Haven Salvage, owned by his brother-in-law Benjamin Moed, until his death at 49.

After completing grade school in The Bronx, Dinnerstein attended Brooklyn College and received her undergraduate degree in 1943, earning a bachelor's in Psychology.

Dinnerstein started her graduate studies at Swarthmore College, and earned a PhD in Psychology from the New School for Social Research in 1951. Dinnerstein did her doctoral research under Solomon Asch, a prominent social psychologist.

== Activism and career ==
After earning her degree, Dinnerstein was engaged in fighting for progressive causes including women's rights, environmentalism, an end to the Vietnam war, and against nuclear proliferation. As part of her passion about these issues, she participated in a demonstration that briefly shutdown Wall Street.

A resident of Leonia, New Jersey, she taught at Rutgers–Newark as a professor of Psychology from 1959 until 1989. Her early work involved laboratory studies on the influence of overlapping structures on various aspects of sensory perception. Whilst there, Dinnerstein recruited Asch and they co-founded the Institute for Cognitive Studies at Rutgers.

In addition to teaching, research and writing, Dinnerstein had a commitment to feminist politics. She was central to the first federal lawsuit against gender-based pay inequity in academia, and was an active participant in the Women's Encampment for a Future of Peace and Justice in the early 1980s.

Before her death in 1992, Dinnerstein was involved in a new project about environmental issues called "Sentience and Survival" which explored the ways in which human cognitive structures interfere with taking appropriate actions to prevent environmental devastation.

== Works ==
=== The Mermaid and the Minotaur (1976) ===
During her time at Rutgers University, Dinnerstein began writing her first book, The Mermaid and the Minotaur: Sexual Arrangement and Human Malaise (1976) (also published in the UK as The Rocking of the Cradle and the Ruling of the World). She wrote from the perspectives of a microsociologist, a feminist, a humanist, an ecologist, and a psychoanalyst.

Drawing from elements of psychoanalysis, particularly those developed by Melanie Klein, Dinnerstein argued that sexism and aggression are both inevitable consequences of childrearing being left exclusively to women. She argued that women are infantilized and degraded as a result of false perceptions that they are associated with the realm of childhood as opposed to the world of adulthood. Women become the scapegoats of adult resentment towards authority figures because they served as controlling authority figures during childhood. Women are blamed for life's pitfalls because of the early-childhood perception that one's mother takes care of everything, so if something is wrong, it's the mother's fault for not making it all right. Men use sexism and patriarchal means to control resented authority figures (women). Men are isolated from the world of emotions and interpersonal relations usually associated with childhood, creating an impossible and harmful standard of male infallibility, invincibility, and invulnerability. As a solution, Dinnerstein proposed that men and women equally share childcare responsibilities. She concluded by saying that she recognised that families had started to move toward shared parenting for reasons unrelated to the consequences of female-dominated childcare; nonetheless, she wanted shared parenting to be “fortified by full awareness of these considerations" and this effort towards shared parenting"is supported by all the forms of action now being taken toward equity in the economic, political, legal, etc., spheres".

Dinnerstein's theories in this book were not widely accepted at the time they were published.

The book became a classic of U.S. second-wave feminism and was later translated into seven languages.

=== Other publications ===
- Dinnerstein, D. (1965). Previous and concurrent visual experience as determinants of phenomenal shape. The American Journal of Psychology, 78(2), 235-242.
- Dinnerstein, D. (1988). What does feminism mean? Women & Environments, 10, 7-8.
- Dinnerstein, D. (1990). Survival on earth: The meaning of feminism. Peace Review: A Journal of Social Justice, 2(4), 7-10.
- Dinnerstein, D., Gerstein, I. & Michael, G. (1967). Interaction of simultaneous and successive stimulus groupings in determining apparent weight. Journal of Experimental Psychology, 73(2). 298-302.
- Dinnerstein, D. & Wertheimer, M. (1957). Some determinants of phenomenal overlapping. The American Journal of Psychology, 70(1), 21-37.

== Personal life ==
During her collegiate years, she met and married Sidney Mintz, who later became a well known anthropologist. Their marriage ended shortly after WWII.

Dinnerstein then married Walter James Miller. Miller was a poet and professor at New York University. In the year 1955, the two had their only child, Naomi May. They divorced in 1961.

Dinnerstein married Daniel S. Lehrman, a psychologist, in 1961. Lehrman, who was previously married, had two daughters of his own, Nina and June, who lived with their mother Gertrude Lehrman in Queens, New York. Daniel and Dorothy lived in the Greenwich Village section of New York City and then in Leonia, New Jersey.

Lehrman taught and did research at Rutgers University, as did Dinnerstein. Lehrman died suddenly of a heart attack in 1972, at the age of 53.

== Death ==
On December 17, 1992, at the age of 69, Dinnerstein was killed in a car accident. She was survived by a daughter and two step-daughters.
