= Duocentric social network =

A duocentric social network is a type of social network composed of the combined network members of a dyad. The network consists of mutual, overlapping ties between members of the dyad as well as non-mutual ties. While an explicit conceptualization of duocentric social networks appeared for the first time in an academic publication in 2008, the history of the analysis dates back to at least the 1950s and has spanned the fields of psychology, sociology, and health.

== History ==
=== Original conception ===
Coromina et al. coined the term duocentered networks to describe the analytical technique of combining two individuals' (or egos) social networks to examine both the shared network members (or alters) between a dyad and those that are connected to only one individual. In this original conceptualization, Coromina et al. did not consider the relationships between the alters (i.e., the ties between alters) to be a necessary component of duocentric network analysis.

The impetus for this original conceptualization was a compromise between the two most commonly used social network analytical methods: egocentric and sociocentric network analyses. In an egocentric network analysis, a singular individual, his or her network members, and (occasionally), the ties between those alters are the focal point of the analysis. Egocentric analyses have been used in a wide range of fields, including physical health, psychopathology, family studies, and intimate relationships. On the other hand, the sociocentric network approach utilizes a bounded group as the unit of analyses, examining all ties between actors in the group. This has been utilized to study health in retirement communities and entire cities (e.g., the Framingham Heart Study), as well as in the workplace and classroom settings. Sociocentric networks could be used to answer research questions focused on dyads, but the time, cost, and difficulty of collecting network data from all members in a bounded group is often prohibitive. Coromina et al. also state that duocentered networks relieve issues of data collection in sociocentric networks. First, it reduces "respondent inaccuracy" in reporting network contacts, which will be more prevalent in less well socially connected individuals. Because the dyad is selected for a specific network research question, they are more likely to be central members of their networks and better positioned to accurately report on their network contacts. Second, the technique reduces "unit non-response," which is the failure of an eligible study participant to respond or provide enough information to deem the response statistically usable. Because the focus of a duocentered network is only two individuals rather than a larger group, it will ostensibly be easier to gather usable information.

=== Kennedy et al. (2015) expansion ===
Kennedy et al. maintained this basic framework, but redefined the concept as duocentric networks, and suggested that information on the relatedness of ties in the network should be collected. Coromina et al. did not take this approach because of the respondent inaccuracy and unit non-response bias that similarly affect sociocentric analyses. Respondent inaccuracy in the context of duocentric networks means that people will inaccurately report the connections between their network members. Unit non-response follows from this difficulty; if people are unable to report connections, certain analyses that rely on these connections may not be possible.

== Analysis ==
=== Structural Measures ===
There are several common structural metrics derived from duocentric social networks:

- Degree centrality: The number of ties that an ego has with other network members. More central egos have a greater number of connections.
- Closeness centrality: An ego has higher closeness centrality as the number of "steps" it takes to get to other alters in the network decreases. If an alter is the friend of a friend of one's partner, this will decrease one's closeness centrality as compared to a friend of one's partner (i.e., one step closer to the ego).
- Betweenness centrality: If a network is visualized as many separate paths connecting network members to each other through varying number of links, an ego has higher betweenness centrality to the extent that they lie on more paths between alters in a network. Higher betweenness centrality indicates that one plays a larger role as an intermediary between network members who may not be directly connected.
- Density: The total number of ties in a network relative to the total number of possible ties in a network.
- Overlap: Unique to duocentric networks, overlap measures the number of shared ties between two egos.
- Diversity: Similar to density, diversity measures the size of the non-overlapping network members of both egos in the dyad.
- Components: A component is a portion of the social network that is disconnected from the rest of the full network. The members in a component are connected either directly or through a maximum of one mutual tie. Generally, a greater number of components signals a less well-connected network.
- Isolates: A measure of fragmentation in the network, isolates in a duocentric network are those that are connected to only one ego and to no other network members.

=== Compositional Measures ===
Compositional measures are the characteristics of the individuals who make up the network or other societal norms and structures that may influence the structure and function of a social network. Compositional measures include social support, intimate relationship approval from network members, proportion of family or friends in the network, demographic characteristics, and norms.

=== Feedback Loops ===
Although primarily supported in egocentric network analyses, evidence suggest that dyads can influence the composition and structure of the duocentric networks in which they are embedded. For example, Bryant, Conger & Meehan (2001) found that a wife's marital satisfaction predicted lower discord between husbands and the wife's parents at a later time.

== Applications ==
=== Application to intimate relationships ===
One of the first studies examining duocentric social networks was Elizabeth Bott's 1957 finding that the density of spouse's separate networks is positively associated with marital role segregation, a finding now known as the Bott Hypothesis. While Bott did not examine the overlapping network of spouses, her work was among the first to collect network data separately from both members of a dyad, and use that data to predict a dyadic phenomenon.

Perhaps the most well-studied phenomenon utilizing a duocentric network approach in the context of intimate relationships is network overlap. Most of this research points to higher relationship satisfaction as the level of overlap increases. Network overlap increases as couples transition to cohabitation, and remarriages tend to have less overlap than first marriages. Additionally, one finding suggests that more equal numbers of each partner's family contained in the overlapping network is associated with higher marital satisfaction for heterosexual couples.

Other structural measures have received relatively less attention in the study of intimate relationships. Research shows a positive association between duocentric network size and marital satisfaction. Additionally, marriages in which both spouses are in their first marriage have larger networks than marriages in which both spouse is remarried. Other studies have highlighted non-results, including that social network density is not associated with relationship satisfaction and that density is not associated with marital role segregation (a refutation of the Bott Hypothesis).

The link between compositional duocentric network factors and intimate relationships is less well-studied. However, evidence from duocentric analyses suggest that discord with in-laws predicts lower satisfaction, commitment, and stability in marriages over time. Additionally, support and approval from the social network tends to be associated with higher commitment and marital satisfaction.

=== Application to other fields ===
Duocentric social network analyses have been used less often outside the context of intimate relationships. One of the earliest examples examined the frequency with which two people mutually named one another in their respective network reports. The study recruited one person who listed their network members, then those network members were contacted and asked to list their own network members. About 86% of the time, people named by the original interviewee also named that interviewee on their own list. Another study of parents of children with brain tumors found that overlap of non-kin was near 50%, while overlap for kin was slightly higher. More peripheral overlapping ties (i.e., those to whom the couple is less close) was associated with lower rates of mental health disorders. Another study examined duocentric networks in sibling pairs aged 7–13. Monozygotic twins had the most overlap in their peer networks (82%), followed by same-sex dizygotic twins (67%), same-sex virtual twins (e.g., unrelated peers matched on certain characteristics; 62%), friend-friend pairs (48%), opposite-sex dizygotic twins (42%), same-sex full siblings (39%), opposite sex virtual twins (37%), and opposite-sex full siblings (27%). Genetics, sex (same- or opposite-sex), age, and relationship intimacy affected rates of peer overlap. Another example used pairs of corporations engaged in a business alliance as the focal unit, and found that the more common partners (i.e., overlap) between the two firms, the less likely their alliance would dissolve.

== Variants of duocentric network analyses ==
Kennedy et al. (2015) outline the most rigorous duocentric network study as one in which both members of the dyad report the specific individuals contained in their social networks. However, the time and cost of this form of data collection has led researchers to use less stringent techniques to gather information on a dyadic network.

=== Global Network Perceptions ===
Rather than asking respondents to list the specific people contained in their social network, researchers occasionally ask for global perceptions of network qualities from both members of a dyad. This methodology limits many structural analyses because the relationships between network members is unknown, unless the structural qualities are addressed at a global level (e.g., for global perceptions of overlap, see Kearns & Leonard (2004)). Therefore, these studies typically highlight how compositional network aspects affect the dyad. For example, in the study of intimate relationship research, this methodology has been used to show how global perceptions of approval from the network vary across relationship stage, closeness to family predicts changes in marital happiness, the degree to which liking one's partner's family predicts relationship dissolution, the effect of network support on relationship satisfaction, and the relationship between time spent with the network and relationship commitment.

=== Single Ego Reporting ===
Another variant of the duocentric network approach is to interview only one member of a focal dyad, but require the individual to report on both their own and the other person's social network, or the other individual's relationship to their own network. In many of these studies, respondents report global network perceptions. For example, one study asked respondents to report on the propensity for a respondent's relationship partner to receive support from their own network (a global measure of support). Support was positively associated with relationship satisfaction. Another study asked respondents to report their perception of approval from their relationship partner's family (another global measure), which was found to be negatively associated with relationship dissolution.

However, some research utilizes specific alter reporting in a single ego methodology. Milardo (1982) asked respondents to report their romantic partner's relationship to each of their own, specific, network members. This method allowed the researcher to understand how much of the ego's social network overlapped with his or her partner without collecting information from the partner. However, this approach risks the ego inaccurately reporting the relationship between their partner and the individual network members. Another study asked homeless youth to list recent sexual partners, other non-sexual partner network members, and the relationships between these alters. The risk of unprotected sex was higher to the degree that sexual partners knew other members of the youth's social network.

== See also ==
- Social network analysis
- Social network
- Social psychology
- Industrial and organizational psychology
- Health psychology
- Sociology
- Intimate relationship
