= Krackhardt kite graph =

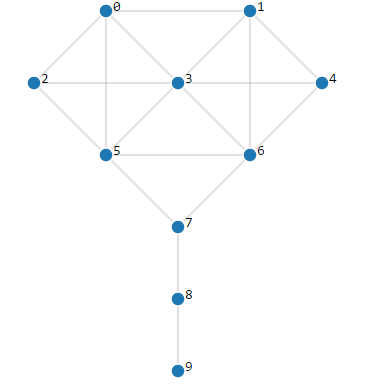
- Vertices: 10
- Edges: 18
- Properties: Simple

In graph theory, the Krackhardt kite graph is a simple graph with ten nodes. The graph is named after David Krackhardt, a researcher of social network theory.

Krackhardt introduced the graph in 1990 to distinguish different concepts of centrality. It has the property that the vertex with maximum degree (labeled 3 in the figure, with degree 6), the vertex with maximum betweenness centrality (labeled 7), and the two vertices with maximum closeness centrality (labeled 5 and 6) are all different from each other.
