= Level of analysis =

Location, size, or scale of a research target

Level of analysis is used in the social sciences to point to the location, size, or scale of a research target. It is distinct from unit of observation in that the former refers to a more or less integrated set of relationships while the latter refers to the distinct unit from which data have been or will be gathered. Together, the unit of observation and the level of analysis help define the population of a research enterprise.

== Level of analysis vs unit of analysis ==
Level of analysis is closely related to the term unit of analysis, and some scholars have used them interchangeably, while others argue for a need for distinction. Ahmet Nuri Yurdusev wrote that "the level of analysis is more of an issue related to the framework/context of analysis and the level at which one conducts one's analysis, whereas the question of the unit of analysis is a matter of the 'actor' or the 'entity' to be studied". Manasseh Wepundi noted the difference between "the unit of analysis, that is the phenomenon about which generalizations are to be made, that which each 'case' in the data file represents and the level of analysis, that is, the manner in which the units of analysis can be arrayed on a continuum from the very small (micro) to very large (macro) levels."

== Analytical levels in social science ==
Although levels of analysis are not necessarily mutually exclusive, there are three general levels into which social science research may fall: micro level, meso level or middle range, and macro level.

=== Micro level ===
The smallest unit of analysis in the social sciences is an individual in their social setting. At the micro level, also referred to as the local level, the research population typically is an individual in their social setting or a small group of individuals in a particular social context. Examples of micro levels of analysis include, but are not limited to, the following individual analysis type approach:

- Alien, stateless person, asylum seeker, refugee
- Person
- Citizen
- Partnership, marriage
- Families
- Household
- Neighborhood

=== Meso level ===
In general, a meso-level analysis indicates a population size that falls between the micro and macro levels, such as a community or an organization. However, meso level may also refer to analyses that are specifically designed to reveal connections between micro and macro levels. It is sometimes referred to as mid range, especially in sociology. Examples of meso-level units of analysis include the following:

- Clan
- Tribe
- Community
- Village, town, city
- Formal organization
- State

=== Macro level ===
Macro-level analyses generally trace the outcomes of interactions, such as economic or other resource transfer interactions over a large population. It is also referred to as the global level. Examples of macro-level units of analysis include, but are not limited to, the following:

- Nation
- Society
- Civilization
- International
- Global

== Level of analysis in cognitive science ==
=== Marr's tri-level hypothesis ===
According to David Marr, information processing systems must be understood at three distinct yet complementary levels of analysis – an analysis at one level alone is not sufficient.

==== Computational ====
The computational level of analysis identifies what the information processing system does (e.g.: what problems does it solve or overcome) and similarly, why does it do these things.

==== Algorithmic/representational ====
The algorithmic/representational level of analysis identifies how the information processing system performs its computations, specifically, what representations are used and what processes are employed to build and manipulate the representations.

==== Physical/implementation ====
The physical level of analysis identifies how the information processing system is physically realized (in the case of biological vision, what neural structures and neuronal activities implement the visual system).

=== Poggio's learning level ===
After thirty years of the book Vision (David Marr. 1982. W. H. Freeman and Company), Tomaso Poggio added one higher level beyond the computational level, that is the learning.

I am not sure that Marr would agree, but I am tempted to add learning as the very top level of understanding, above the computational level. [...] Only then may we be able to build intelligent machines that could learn to see—and think—without the need to be programmed to do it.

— Tomaso Poggio, Vision (David Marr. 2010. The MIT Press), Afterword, P.367

== Level of analysis in international relations ==
In international relations, level of analysis is generally divided into three categories – individual, state, and international system. However, newer discussions of globalization have led to a newer level of analysis to be considered.

The framework of analysis originated from K. Waltz's 1959 book entitled Man, the State, and War. An examination is J. Singer's "The Level-of-Analysis Problem in International Relations" (1961). While the framework is widely discussed, not many scholarly articles use it. Two writings may shed light on its advantages and disadvantages: M. Brawley's 2005 case studies of international economic relations and S. Hu's 2015 analysis of small states' diplomatic recognition of Taiwan.

The three (or four) levels of analysis cannot describe every effect and there is unlimited number of levels between the three primary ones, levels of analysis will help understand how one force in political power affects another. Generally, power is the concept that collects all the analysis together. For example, the struggle for power may be the cause of war, but the struggle for power may originate in the individual human being's lust for power. The lust for power is individual level of analysis, while the struggle for power is systemic level of analysis.

=== Individual level ===
The individual level of analysis locates the cause of events in individual leaders or the immediate circle of decision makers within a particular country. It focuses on human actors on the world stage identifying the characteristics of human decision making. For example, the cause of World War I is from the particular leaders in power at that time. Kaiser Wilhelm II is considered to be the level from which the cause originated. It may have been his need for power to hide a sense of inferiority, or it may have been his inability to understand the intricacies of statecraft, the way Otto von Bismarck did. Or it may have been his idea about the monarchy and German destiny. All three possibilities are drawn from an individual level of analysis.

=== Domestic/state level ===
The domestic level of analysis locates causes in the character of the domestic system of specific states. Thus, war is caused by aggressive or warlike states, not by evil, inept, or misguided people or the structure of power in the international system. The failure of domestic institutions may also cause war. In World War I, the internal collapse of the Austro-Hungarian Empire, or the brittle coalition inside Germany of agricultural and industrial interest, such as rye and iron, are often cited as important causes. Domestic level cases may come from various characteristics of the domestic system. Capitalist and socialist economies generate different attitudes and behavior.

The Muslim and Christian religions or democratic and nondemocratic political ideologies do as well. Stable and failed institutions are domestic level factors affecting state behavior. A great worry today is the existence of failed states, meaning states whose domestic institutions have broken down, such as Somalia. Another worry here is existence of a rogue state, such as North Korea, which may pass nuclear weapons on to terrorists. Any type of state come from the domestic level of analysis, but a failed state usually means an institutional breakdown at domestic level of analysis, whereas a rogue state often implies evil intentions by individual – individual level of analysis.

=== Systemic level ===
The systemic level of analysis explains outcomes from a system wide level that includes all states. It seeks explanations for international phenomena by considering the nature or structure of the international political system at the period under study. It takes into account both the position of states in the international system and their interrelationships. The position of states constitutes the systemic structural level of analysis. This involves the relative distribution of power, such as which state; great, middle, or small power, and geopolitics; such as which state is sea or land power. The interaction of states constitutes the systemic process level of analysis. At this level, we are concerned with which state aligns with which other states and which state negotiates with which other states. Thus, we can explain World War I in terms of the absence of system wide institutions, such as League of Nations, which was not created until after World War I to prevent such wars in the future. However, system wide institution does not always mean harmony among nations, as seen in the World War II. The cause of World War II is seen as the failure of a systemic institution, which led new institutions of the United Nations to carry on reformed legacy of the League of Nations.

=== Global level ===
Global level factors are much like Systemic level factors, however the core difference is that global factors are not necessarily created by states, whereas systemic factors are. Global factors can be the outcome of individuals, interest groups, states, nonstate actors or even natural conditions – however they cannot be traced to the actions of any one state or even group of states. An example can be how the internet can shape how policy is formed, through social media or forums – where an idea is formed over time by a group of individuals, but the source is generally hard to determine. An environmental natural example is how global warming can help shape how society views certain policies, or help shape new policies themselves. Droughts caused by rising temperatures can cause global actors to form alliances to help procure critical resources – and as writers such as Peter Gleik and Michael Klare have shown, the possibility of "Water Wars" in dry countries in Africa and the Middle East are very possible.

== See also ==
- Abstraction (sociology)
- Boundary problem (spatial analysis)
- Four causes
- High- and low-level
- Integrative level
- Self-categorization theory § Levels of abstraction
- Social groups
- Social network
- Spatial scale
- Statistical unit
- Tinbergen's four questions
