= Triad (sociology) =

Sociological term: group of three people

Triad refers to a group of three people in sociology. It is one of the simplest human groups that can be studied and is mostly looked at by microsociology. The study of triads and dyads was pioneered by German sociologist Georg Simmel at the end of the nineteenth century.

A triad can be viewed as a group of three people that can create different group interactions. This specific grouping is common yet overlooked in society for many reasons. Those being that it is compared to the lives of others, how they shape society, and how communication plays a role in different relationships scenarios.

It was derived in the late 1800s to early 1900s and evolved throughout time to shape group interactions in the present. Simmel also hypothesized between dyads and triads and how they may differ. A dyad is a group of two people that interact while a triad is another person added on to create more communicational interactions. For example: adding an extra person, therefore creating a triad, this can result in different language barriers, personal connection, and an overall impression of the third person.

Simmel wanted to convey to his audience that a triad is not a basic group with positive interactions, but how these interactions can differ depending on person to person.

== Studies conducted ==
=== Sibling relationships ===
Both tests and studies have been conducted as to how siblings interact and how age, gender, and the number of siblings can create a triad. A majority of the population has doubled over the last decade and recently has been proven that the more parents conceive, the better outcome a child will have when relating to other siblings. It can all depend on the relationships that different families have acquired as children get older. Creating and distinguishing between how a family can interact is a perfect everyday example of a triad in sociology. Applying the attachment theory created by John Bowlby can help decipher the differences between communication and interactions across the world.

== Different forms ==
=== Closed form ===
In triadic closure, a group of three people can form relationships between each individual in that group. Therefore, creating both personal and emotional connections amongst all three individuals. This can be extremely important for others to understand that each person in this triad performs different roles and has different characteristics.

=== Open form ===
Even though a triad consists of three people, an open form of a relationship can alter because two out of three members in this group can clash. This happens because the relationships for the triad are always interacting with each other which is why they have common things. This can be due to both structural construction and informational construction. They both provide a means of stability and assurance to sustain an open form relationship into a closed form relationship. Structural construction can impose stress and clustering as a sense of bad communication between individuals and their different interactions. Informational construction conveys the need for privacy and how various individuals can clash when knowing something the other does not.

== Georg Simmel ==
=== The birth of modernity and how it has shaped society ===
Georg Simmel goes into depth on the idea and how he creates the basis of a triad and what led him to his findings. It goes into discussing how places have taken triads shape. For example, in World War One he categorized the war into three various sections—European nationalism, materialism and imperialism. These three fall under "mammonism"; this is the support of Americanism in World War Two and its effects that resulted from the war.

=== Exchange and cohesion in dyads and triads ===
Simmel conveys how cohesion has played a role in distinguishing between a dyad and a triad. Three main factors that have led to these diverse groups is justified by 1) Dyads result in less behavioral changes when compared to triads, 2) Bonds that coincide more with triads than dyads, and 3) Emotion plays a bigger role when communicating between two people (dyad) versus a group with three people (triad). The last factor is mainly because communication and trust can be altered when mixing emotions between relationships. While in a group of three people it is less likely because the majority constantly communicate and come to an agreement as to what is best.

=== Triadic closure ===
Georg Simmel had studied the means of how interaction including sports can alter or contribute to how a group can communicate. Going through a list of those that the player is either friends or enemies with, will then result if there is a positive or negative correlation between the two. This theory is known as triadic closure and was introduced by George Simmel. Network closure has provided a basis of social structure and independent actions amongst other individuals. Social structure and structural action was formed on the foundation of his or her own opinions as one together.

== See also ==
- Antipositivism
- Gemeinschaft and Gesellschaft
- Ideal type
- Normal type
- Reflexivity (social theory)
- Simmelian tie
- Social action
- Social relation
- Structure and agency
