= Simmelian tie =

Nodes (individuals) and ties (connections) in social networks.

A simmelian tie (can be capitalized as a Simmelian tie) is a type of an interpersonal tie, a concept used in the social network analysis. For a simmelian tie to exist, there must be three (a triad) or more of reciprocal strong ties in a group. A simmelian tie is seen as an even stronger tie than a regular strong tie.

A simmelian tie can be seen as a basic element of a clique.

== Definition and an example ==
Whereas the basic ties are known as strong or weak and focus on the strength of the analyzed relationship, simmelian ties are concerned with more than just the strength of the relationship. They look at the number of strong ties within a group. For a simmelian tie to exist, there must be three (a triad) or more of reciprocal strong ties in a group. A simmelian tie is viewed as even stronger than a regular strong tie.

For example, if Adam has a strong tie to Betty, and both Adam and Betty share a strong tie to Charles, this three-way tie would be a simmelian one.

== History and use ==
The concept of a Simmelian tie has been developed by David Krackhardt in his 1999 paper, The ties that torture: Simmelian tie analysis in organizations. Research in the Sociology of Organizations. Krackhardt developed the concept of a simmelian tie as an alternative to Ronald Burt's structural hole theory. Simmelian ties are based on the work of, and named after, Georg Simmel, a sociologist who distinguished social triads as an important social structure that's qualitatively different from dyadic relationships in more and more important ways than just the number of people participating.

The concept of a Simmelian tie is related to that of a clique; each pair of nodes (individuals) in a clique has a Simmelian tie between them. Thus a simmelian tie can be defined as a basic tie in a clique, or a co-clique relationship (between individuals who belong to a specific clique).

A simmelian tie strengthens the relationship (tie) between the individuals, but it is also restricting - it subjects those individuals to a group norm. In his original paper, Krackhardt stressed that restriction, noting that the more cliques one has simmelian ties to, the more constrained one is.

The concept of a simmelian tie is used in the social network analysis. It has been used in the study of organizations, including Wikipedia.

== See also ==
- Georg Simmel
