= Abstraction (sociology) =

Levels at which theoretical concepts can be understood

Sociological abstraction refers to the varying levels at which theoretical concepts can be understood. It is a tool for objectifying and simplifying sociological concepts. This idea is very similar to the philosophical understanding of abstraction. There are two basic levels of sociological abstraction: sociological concepts and operationalized sociological concepts.

A sociological concept is a mental construct that represents some part of the world in a simplified form. An example of a mental construct is the idea of class, or the distinguishing of two groups based on their income, culture, power, or some other defining characteristic(s). An operational definition specifies concrete, replicable procedures that reliably produce a differentiated, measurable outcome. Similarly, concepts can remain abstract or can be operationalized. Operationalizing a sociological concept takes it to the concrete level by defining how one is going to measure it. Thus, with the concept of social class one could operationalize it by actually measuring people's income. Once operationalized, you have a concrete representation of a sociological concept.

== Levels of analysis ==
In addition to the basic levels of sociological abstraction, sociological concepts are often understood at multiple levels as a result of sociological theorizing. Sociological theories postulate relationships between sociological concepts. It is generally understood that there are three levels of sociological theorizing, also known as levels of analysis:

=== Micro level ===
The smallest level of analysis is the micro level of analysis, also referred to as Microsociology. It concerns the nature of everyday human social interactions and agency on a small scale: face to face. Microsociology is based on interpretative analysis rather than statistical or empirical observation, and shares close association with the philosophy of phenomenology. Methods include symbolic interactionism and ethnomethodology; ethnomethodology in particular has led to many academic sub-divisions and studies such as micro-linguistical research and other related aspects of human social behaviour. Examples of micro levels of analysis include, but are not limited to, the following individual analysis type approach:

- Alien, stateless person, asylum seeker, refugee
- Person
- Citizen
- Partnership, marriage
- Families
- Household
- Neighborhood

=== Meso level ===
In general, a meso-level analysis indicates a population size that falls between the micro and macro levels, such as a community or an organization. However, meso level may also refer to analyses that are specifically designed to reveal connections between micro and macro levels. It is sometimes referred to as mid range, especially in sociology. Examples of meso-level units of analysis include the following:

- Clan
- Tribe
- Community
- Village, town, city
- Formal organization
- State

=== Macro level ===
Macrosociology involves a large-scale approach to sociology, emphasizing the analysis of social systems and populations at the structural level, often at a necessarily high level of theoretical abstraction. Though macrosociology does concern itself with individuals, families, and other constituent aspects of a society, it does so in relation to larger social system of which such elements are a part. The approach is also able to analyze generalized collectivities (e.g. "the city", "the church"). Examples of macro-level units of analysis include, but are not limited to, the following:

- Nation
- Society
- Civilization
- International
- Global

== Origins ==
The issue with associating a concrete definition to the term sociological abstraction, is that there is no universally accepted definition. Although the earliest form of abstraction in sociology was discussed by sociologist Talcott Parsons in the 1950s, his work in The Social System (1951) failed to identify an exact definition. Rather, he emphasized the abstract element of sociological theory and made the distinction between what constitutes a theory, on one hand, and the object it refers to, on the other. He also argued that something becomes a fact first when it has been incorporated into an abstract conceptual scheme. In the following years, the topic was discussed by Robert K. Merton, C. Wright Mills, Paul Lazarsfeld, along with other theorist, who criticized parson work on abstraction in a variety of ways. During its peak of discussion in the 1950s, the debate over the concept became so intricate, it risked being disembedded and artificial type of analysis along the lines of Parsons.

== Contemporary abstracting ==
While previous studies emphasize the importance of organization, little is said about organization itself. Sociologists today focus on how organization is discerned, represented, and explained. Organization is a matter of interactions between casually differentiated parts within a complex system. The article Abstraction and the Organization of Mechanisms, goes into detail with a variety of models which represent the organization of abstraction. They visually represent the interaction between different factors and highlight casual connectivity between mechanisms. As an example, the FFL model clarifies an important aspect of abstraction. Omitting detail permits one to distinguish those underlying factors that matter from those that do not. In other words, it is easier to capture the relevant aspects and connections of the abstracted concept, when other less relevant details, are absent from the model.

== See also ==
- High- and low-level
- Level of analysis
- Integrative level
