= Center for Christian-Democratic Studies =

Informal organization, Republic of Serbia

The Center for Christian-Democratic Studies (Serbian: Центар за хришћанско-демократске студије / Centar za hrišćansko-demokratske studije), formerly known as the Serbian Christian Democratic Movement, is an informal organization in the Republic of Serbia. It was founded in 2010. The Center for Christian-Democratic Studies promotes a Christian Democracy.
