= Bridge (interpersonal) =

A bridge is a type of social tie that connects two different groups in a social network.

== General bridge ==
In general, a bridge is a direct tie between nodes that would otherwise be in disconnected components of the graph.

This means that say that A and B make up a social networking graph, $n_1$ is in A, $n_2$ is in B, and there is a social tie $e$ between $n_1$ and $n_2$. If $e$ were to be removed, A and B would become disconnected components of the graph. This means that $e$ is a bridge.

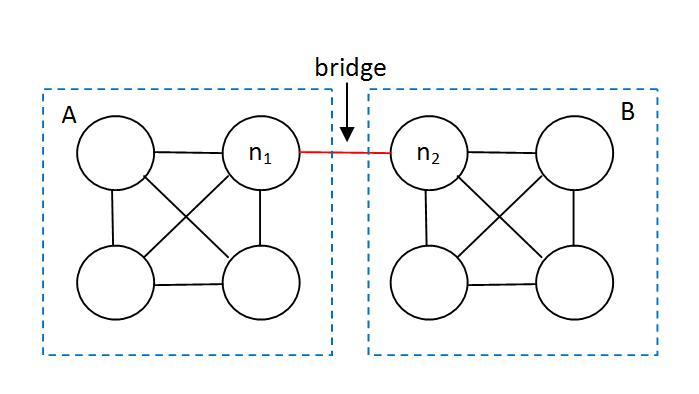

For example, A could represent a corporation and B Congress. $n_1$ could then be a lobbyist and $n_2$ a Congressman. $e$ would then represent the relationship between that corporation and Congress that only exists through the lobbyist.

This is very similar to the concept of a bridge in graph theory, but with special social networking properties such as strong and weak ties.

== Local bridge ==
Local bridges are ties between two nodes in a social graph that are the shortest route by which information might travel from those connected to one to those connected to the other. Local bridges differ from regular bridges in that the end points of the local bridge once the bridge has been deleted cannot have a tie directly between them and should not share any common neighbors. Also if the local bridge is deleted the distance between these two nodes will be increased to a value strictly more than two.

== Social network implications ==
In social networks, bridge relationships transmit information from one group to another. The breadth of information spread depends heavily on the number and connectedness of the bridges available to the originators of the information. Author Malcolm Gladwell characterizes people that habitually act as bridges as Connectors in his book The Tipping Point.

Bridges and local bridges are powerful ways to convey awareness of new things, but they are weak at transmitting behaviors that are in some way risky or costly to adopt. Weak ties are able to spread awareness of a joke or an on-line video with remarkable speed, but political mobilization moves more sluggishly, needing to gain momentum within neighborhoods and small communities. McAdams observed that strong ties, rather than weak ties, played a much more dominant role in recruitment to Freedom Summer on college campuses in the 1960s.

== See also ==
- Interpersonal ties
