= Triadic closure =

Concept in social network theory

A diagram demonstrating the principle of triadic closure. If A is linked to B, and A is also linked to C, then there is a tendency for B to become linked to C.

Triadic closure is a concept in social network theory, first suggested by German sociologist Georg Simmel in his 1908 book Soziologie (Sociology: Inquiries into the Construction of Social Forms). Triadic closure is the property among three nodes A, B, and C (representing people, for instance), that if the connections A-B and A-C exist, there is a tendency for the new connection B-C to be formed. Triadic closure can be used to understand and predict the growth of networks, although it is only one of many mechanisms by which new connections are formed in complex networks.

== History ==
Triadic closure was made popular by Mark Granovetter in his 1973 article The Strength of Weak Ties. There he synthesized the theory of cognitive balance first introduced by Fritz Heider in 1946 with a Simmelian understanding of social networks. In general terms, cognitive balance refers to the propensity of two individuals to want to feel the same way about an object. If the triad of three individuals is not closed, then the person connected to both of the individuals will want to close this triad in order to achieve closure in the relationship network.

== Measurements ==
The two most common measures of triadic closure for a graph are (in no particular order) the clustering coefficient and transitivity for that graph.

=== Clustering coefficient ===
One measure for the presence of triadic closure is clustering coefficient, as follows:

Let $G = (V,E)$ be an undirected simple graph (i.e., a graph having no self-loops or multiple edges) with V the set of vertices and E the set of edges. Also, let $N = |V|$ and $M = |E|$ denote the number of vertices and edges in G, respectively, and let $d_i$ be the degree of vertex i.

We can define a triangle among the triple of vertices $i$, $j$, and $k$ to be a set with the following three edges: {(i,j), (j,k), (i,k)}.

We can also define the number of triangles that vertex $i$ is involved in as $\delta (i)$ and, as each triangle is counted three times, we can express the number of triangles in G as $\delta (G) = \frac{1}{3} \sum_{i\in V} \ \delta (i)$.

Assuming that triadic closure holds, only two strong edges are required for a triple to form. Thus, the number of theoretical triples that should be present under the triadic closure hypothesis for a vertex $i$ is $\tau (i) = \binom{d_i}{2}$, assuming $d_i \ge 2$. We can express $\tau (G) = \frac{1}{3} \sum_{i\in V} \ \tau (i)$.

Now, for a vertex $i$ with $d_i \ge 2$, the clustering coefficient $c(i)$ of vertex $i$ is the fraction of triples for vertex $i$ that are closed, and can be measured as $\frac{\delta (i)}{\tau (i)}$. Thus, the clustering coefficient $C(G)$ of graph $G$ is given by $C(G) = \frac {1}{N_2} \sum_{i \in V, d_i \ge 2} c(i)$, where $N_2$ is the number of nodes with degree at least 2.

=== Transitivity ===
Another measure for the presence of triadic closure is transitivity, defined as $T(G) = \frac{3\delta (G)}{\tau (G)}$.

== Causes and effects ==
In a trust network, triadic closure is likely to develop due to the transitive property. If a node A trusts node B, and node B trusts node C, node A will have the basis to trust node C. In a social network, strong triadic closure occurs because there is increased opportunity for nodes A and C with common neighbor B to meet and therefore create at least weak ties. Node B also has the incentive to bring A and C together to decrease the latent stress in two separate relationships.

Networks that stay true to this principle become highly interconnected and have very high clustering coefficients. However, networks that do not follow this principle turn out to be poorly connected and may suffer from instability once negative relations are included.

Triadic closure is a good model for how networks will evolve over time. While simple graph theory tends to analyze networks at one point in time, applying the triadic closure principle can predict the development of ties within a network and show the progression of connectivity.

In social networks, triadic closure facilitates cooperative behavior, but when new connections are made via referrals from existing connections the average global fraction of cooperators is less than when individuals choose new connections randomly from the population at large. Two possible effects of these are by the structural and informational construction. The structural construction arises from the propensity toward high clusterability. The informational construction comes from the assumption that an individual knows something about a friend's friend, as opposed to a random stranger.

== Strong triadic closure property and local bridges ==
A node A with strong ties to two neighbors B and C obeys the Strong Triadic Closure Property if these neighbors have an edge (either a weak or strong tie) between them.
