= Informal organization =

Social structure that governs how people work together

The informal organization is the interlocking social structure that governs how people work together in practice. It is the aggregate of norms, personal and professional connections through which work gets done and relationships are built among people who share a common organizational affiliation or cluster of affiliations. It consists of a dynamic set of personal relationships, social networks, communities of common interest, and emotional sources of motivation. The informal organization evolves, and the complex social dynamics of its members also.

Tended effectively, the informal organization complements the more explicit structures, plans, and processes of the formal organization: it can accelerate and enhance responses to unanticipated events, foster innovation, enable people to solve problems that require collaboration across boundaries, and create footpaths showing where the formal organization may someday need to pave a way.

== The informal organization and the formal organization ==
The nature of the informal organization becomes more distinct when its key characteristics are juxtaposed with those of the formal organization.

Key characteristics of the informal organization:

- evolving constantly
- grass roots
- dynamic and responsive
- excellent at motivation
- requires insider knowledge to be seen
- treats people as individuals
- flat and fluid
- cohered by trust and reciprocity
- difficult to pin down
- collective decision making
- essential for situations that change quickly or are not yet fully understood

Key characteristics of the formal organization:

- enduring, unless deliberately altered
- top-down
- missionary
- static
- excellent at alignment
- plain to see
- equates "person" with "role"
- hierarchical
- bound together by codified rules and order
- easily understood and explained
- critical for dealing with situations that are known and consistent

Historically, some have regarded the informal organization as the byproduct of insufficient formal organization—arguing, for example, that "it can hardly be questioned that the ideal situation in the business organization would be one where no informal organization existed." However, the contemporary approach—one suggested as early as 1925 by Mary Parker Follett, the pioneer of community centers and author of influential works on management philosophy—is to integrate the informal organization and the formal organization, recognizing the strengths and limitations of each. Integration, as Follett defined it, means breaking down apparent sources of conflict into their basic elements and then building new solutions that neither allow domination nor require compromise. In other words, integrating the informal organization with the formal organization replaces competition with coherence.

At a societal level, the importance of the relationship between formal and informal structures can be seen in the relationship between civil society and state authority. The power of integrating the formal organization and the informal organization can also be seen in many successful businesses.

== Functions ==
Keith Davis suggests that informal groups serve at least four major functions within the formal organizational structure.

=== Perpetuate the cultural and social values ===
They perpetuate the cultural and social values that the group holds dear. Certain values are usually already held in common among informal group members. Day-to-day interaction reinforces these values that perpetuate a particular lifestyle and preserve group unity and integrity. For example, a college management class of 50 students may contain several informal groups that constitute the informal organization within the formal structure of the class. These groups may develop out of fraternity or sorority relationships, dorm residency, project work teams, or seating arrangements. Dress codes, hairstyles, and political party involvement are reinforced among the group members.

They provide social status and satisfaction that may not be obtained from the formal organization. In a large organization (or classroom), a worker (or student) may feel like an anonymous number rather than a unique individual. Members of informal groups, however, share jokes and gripes, eat together, play and work together, and are friends-which contributes to personal esteem, satisfaction, and a feeling of worth.

=== Promote communication among members ===
The informal group develops a communication channel or system (i.e., grapevine) to keep its members informed about what management actions will affect them in various ways. Many astute managers use the grape- vine to "informally" convey certain information about company actions and rumors.

=== Provide social control ===
They provide social control by influencing and regulating behavior inside and outside the group. Internal control persuades members of the group to conform to its lifestyle. For example, if a student starts to wear a coat and tie to class, informal group members may razz and convince the student that such attire is not acceptable and therefore to return to sandals, jeans, and T-shirts. External control is directed to such groups as management, union leadership, and other informal groups.

== Disadvantages ==
Informal organizations also possess the following potential disadvantages and problems that require astute and careful management attention.

=== Resistance to change ===
Perpetuation of values and lifestyle causes informal groups to become overly protective of their "culture" and therefore resist change. For example, if restriction of output was the norm in an autocratic management group, it must continue to be so, even though management changes have brought about a more participative administration. This Culture makes employees more rigid.

=== Role conflict ===
The quest for informal group satisfaction may lead members away from formal organizational objectives. What is good for and desired by informal group members is not always good for the organization. Doubling the number of coffee breaks and the length of the lunch period may be desirable for group members but costly and unprofitable for the firm. Employees' desire to fulfill the requirements and services of both the informal group and management results in role conflict. Role conflict can be reduced by carefully attempting to integrate interests, goals, methods, and evaluation systems of both the informal and formal organizations, resulting in greater productivity and satisfaction on everyone's behalf.

=== Rumor ===
The grapevine dispenses truth and rumor with equal vengeance. Ill-informed employees communicate unverified and untrue information that can create a devastating effect on employees. This can undermine morale, establish bad attitudes, and often result in deviant or, even violent behavior. For example, a student who flunks an exam can start a rumor that a professor is making sexually harassing advances toward one of the students in class. This can create all sorts of ill feelings toward the professor and even result in vengeful acts like "egging" the residence or knocking over the mail box.

=== Conformity ===
Social control promotes and encourages conformity among informal group members, thereby making them reluctant to act too aggressively or perform at too high a level. This can harm the formal organization by stifling initiative, creativity, and diversity of performance. In some British factories, if a group member gets "out of line", tools may be hidden, air may be let out of tires, and other group members may refuse to talk to the deviant for days or weeks. These types of actions can force a good worker to leave the organization.

== Benefits ==
Although informal organizations create unique challenges and potential problems for management, they also provide a number of benefits for the formal organization.

=== Blend with formal system ===
Formal plans. Policies, procedures, and standards cannot solve every problem in a dynamic organization; therefore, informal systems must blend with formal ones to get work done. As early as 1951, Robert Dubin recognized that "informal relations in the organization serve to preserve the organization from the self-destruction that would result from literal obedience to the formal policies, rules, regulations, and procedures". No college or university could function merely by everyone following the "letter of the law" with respect to written policies and procedures. Faculty, staff, and student informal groups must cooperate in fulfilling the "spirit of the law" to effectuate an organized, sensibly run enterprise.

=== Lighten management workload ===
Managers are less inclined to check up on workers when they know the informal organization is cooperating with them. This encourages delegation, decentralization, and greater worker support of the manager, which suggests a probable improvement in performance and overall productivity. When a professor perceives that students are conscientiously working on their term papers and group projects, there are likely to be fewer "pop tests" or important progress reports. This eases the professors load and that of the students and promotes a better relation- ship between both parties.

=== Fill gaps in management abilities ===
For instance, if a manager is weak in financial planning and analysis, a subordinate may informally assist in preparing reports through either suggestions or direct involvement.

=== Act as a safety valve ===
Employees experience frustration, tension, and emotional problems with management and other employees. The informal group provides a means for relieving these emotional and psychological pressures by allowing a person to discuss them among friends openly and candidly. In faculty lounge conversations, frustrations with the dean, department head, or students are "blown off" among empathetic colleagues.

=== Encourage improved management practice ===
Perhaps a subtle benefit of informal groups is that they encourage managers to prepare, plan, organize, and control in a more professional fashion. Managers who comprehend the power of the informal organization recognize that it is a "check and balance" on their use of authority. Changes and projects are introduced with more careful thought and consideration, knowing that the informal organization can easily kill a poorly planned project.

=== Understanding and dealing with the environmental crisis ===
The IRG Solution: hierarchical incompetence and how to overcome it (1984) argued that central media and government-type hierarchical organizations could not adequately understand the environmental crisis we were manufacturing, or how to initiate adequate solutions. It argued that what was required, was the widespread introduction of informal networks or Information Routing Groups which were essentially a description of social networking services prior to the internet.

== Business approaches ==
1. Rapid growth. Starbucks, which grew from 100 employees to over 100,000 in just over a decade, provides structures to support improvisation. In a July 1998 Fast Company article on rapid growth, Starbucks chairman Howard Schultz said, "You can't grow if you're driven only by process, or only by the creative spirit. You've got to achieve a fragile balance between the two sides of the corporate brain."
2. Learning organization. Following a four-year study of the Toyota Production System, Steven J. Spear and H. Kent Bowen concluded in Harvard Business Review that the legendary flexibility of Toyota's operations is due to the way the scientific method is ingrained in its workers – not through formal training or manuals (the production system has never been written down) but through unwritten principles that govern how workers work, interact, construct, and learn.
3. Idea generation. Texas Instruments credits its "Lunatic Fringe"—"an informal and amorphous group of TI engineers (and their peers and contacts outside the company)," according to Fortune Magazine—for its recent successes. "There's this continuum between total chaos and total order," Gene Frantz, the hub of this informal network, explained to Fortune. "About 95% of the people in TI are total order, and I thank God for them every day, because they create the products that allow me to spend money. I'm down here in total chaos, that total chaos of innovation. As a company we recognize the difference between those two and encourage both to occur.

== Related concepts ==
- Organizational behavior; organizational structure; organizational communication
- Community; community of practice; knowledge management
- social network; value network; social Web
- social network analysis; social network
