= Collective network =

Social groups linked by a common bond

A collective network is a set of social groups linked, directly or indirectly, by some common bond. According to this approach of the social sciences to study social relationships, social phenomena are investigated through the properties of relations among groups, which also influence the internal relations among the individuals of each group within the set.

== Overview ==
A collective network may be defined a set of social groups linked, directly or indirectly, by some common bond, shared group status, similar or shared group functions, or geographic or cultural connection; the intergroup links also reinforce the intragroup links, hence the group identity. In informal types of associations, such as the mobilisation of social movements, a collective network may be a set of groups whose individuals, though not necessarily knowing each other or sharing anything outside the organising criteria of the network, are psychologically bound to the network itself and are willing to maintain it indefinitely, tying the internal links among the persons in a group while forming new links with the persons in other groups of the collective network.

== Background ==
It may be interesting to note that the term collective network was firstly officially used in the public domain not in science, instead in a global meeting called by the Zapatista Army of National Liberation (EZLN): on July 27, 1996, over 3,000 activists from more than 40 countries converged on Zapatista territory in rebellion in Chiapas, Mexico, to attend the “First Intercontinental Encuentro for Humanity and Against Neoliberalism”. At the end of the Encuentro (Meeting), the General Command of the EZLN issued the “Second Declaration of La Realidad (The Reality) for Humanity and Against Neoliberalism”, calling for the creation of a “collective network of all our particular struggles and resistances, an intercontinental network of resistance against neoliberalism, an intercontinental network of resistance for humanity.”

In science, the term collective network is related to the study of complex systems. As all complex systems have many interconnected components, the science of networks and the network theory are important aspects of the study of complex systems, hence of the collective network, too. The idea of collective network rises from that of social network and its analysis, that is the social network analysis, SNA.

Cynthia F. Kurtz’s group (Snowden 2005) developed methods of carrying out SNA in which people were asked questions about groups (SNA for identities) and about abstract representations of behavior (SNA for abstractions). Whilst the SNA is primarily concerned with connections among individuals, according to Cynthia F. Kurtz the collective network analysis involves the creation of ‘identity group constructs’ as abstract expressions of group-to-group interactions.

Since 2007 the campus-wide interdisciplinary research group CoCo at Binghamton University, U.S. state of New York, studies the collective dynamics of various types of interacting agents as complex systems. CoCo’s goals are (i) to advance our understanding about the collective dynamics of physical, biological, social, and engineered complex systems through scientific research; (ii) promote interdisciplinary collaboration among faculty and students in different schools and departments; (iii) translate the understanding to products and processes which will improve the well-being of people at regional, state, national and global scales.

In 2011 Emerius, the Euro-Mediterranean Research Institute Upon Social Sciences, based in Rome, started the development of an experimental collective network named Yoosphera with the purpose of studying the intra- and intergroup dynamics in order to reinforce the sense of community in territorial groups along four main components: (i) the rational and affective perception of the affinities with other individuals both within a person’s main group and other groups; (ii) the consciousness and acceptance of the dependence to the intra- and intergroup bonds; (iii) the voluntary commitment to keep the dependence as far as it is valuable and useful for both the person, his main group and the perceived macrogroup (the Yoosphera); (iv) the will of not being detrimental to other individuals, groups or macrogroups.

== Experiments ==
Emerius’s research on collective networks incorporates the small-world network graph, with the nodes represented both by the individuals and their groups, as well as it embeds the idea of Malcolm Gladwell expressed in his book The Tipping Point: How Little Things Can Make a Big Difference, though whilst Gladwell considers that “The success of any kind of social epidemic is heavily dependent on the involvement of people with a particular and rare set of social gifts,” according to Emerius the success of any social epidemic is also strongly dependent on the involvement of special groups with a strong intra- and intergroup degree of cohesion.

Social sciences aim also at the development of new models to manage groups and their internal and external relations according to the limits and the abilities of the human nature, so that to increase the efficiency of the groups. This is the reason behind the Yoosphera, the experimental collective network which is being continuously monitored and developed through a specific piece of software, also named Yoosphera, which reinforces the sense of community in territorial groups as mentioned above. It also nurtures the creation of small groups organised in concentric rings, being small groups easily to be managed according to the theories of Professor Robin Dunbar, in particular Dunbar’s number.

The first observations of the Yooshpera experiment seem to point out that it tends to improve the quality of the relationships between each individual and its environment through the organisation of small cooperative groups which back their own members and the closest groups both in the material and the psychological aspects, thus creating also emotional and affective links.

To the function of socialisation, typical of the social networks, the collective networks add those of organisation and cohesion within and among the groups, that balance the need of maximising the community’s potentialities with that of respecting the different conditions of their members as regards with their culture, profession, family commitments, wealth, time, as well as keeping into account the tidal of those conditions and seconding them with the utmost flexibility.

Related to that of collective network is the definition of collective network intelligence, or colnetigence, which is close to collective intelligence though differs from it as colnetigence emerges from both intra- and intergroup competitive cooperation.
