= James D. Montgomery (economist) =

American economist

James Douglas Montgomery (born April 13, 1963) is professor of sociology and economics at the University of Wisconsin–Madison. He received his Ph.D. in economics from Massachusetts Institute of Technology. He has applied game-theoretic models and non-monotonic logic to present formal analysis and description of social theories and sociological phenomena. He was the recipient of James Coleman Award (1999) for his paper “Toward a Role-Theoretic Conception of Embeddedness”. His paper is a major contribution towards formalization of social theories and sociological interpretation of game theories since he presents a repeated-game model in which the players are not individuals (as traditionally conceived in economic models) but assume social roles such as a profit-maximizing "businessperson" and nonstrategic "friend" (Montgomery, 1999).

In the early 1990s, Montgomery contributed to economic theories of network structures in labor market. In 1991, Montgomery incorporated network structures in an adverse selection model to analyze the effects of social networks on labor market outcomes. In 1992, Montgomery explored the role of “weak ties”, which he defined as non-frequent and transitory social relations, in labor market. He demonstrates that weak ties are positively related to higher wages and higher aggregate employment rates.

He is currently working on integrating non-monotonic logic with social network analysis in the context of sociological theories.

== Selected works ==
- "The Logic of Role Theory: Role Conflict and Stability of the Self-Concept", Journal of Mathematical Sociology, 29 (January 2005): 33–71.
- "A Formalization and Test of the Religious Economies Model", American Sociological Review, 68 (October 2003): 782–809.
- "The Self as a Fuzzy Set of Roles, Role Theory as a Fuzzy System", Sociological Methodology, 30 (2000): 261–314.
- "Adverse Selection and Employment Cycles", Journal of Labor Economics, 17 (April 1999): 281–97.
- "Toward a Role-Theoretic Conception of Embeddedness", American Journal of Sociology, 104 (July 1998): 92–125.
- "The Structure of Social Exchange Networks: A Game-Theoretic Reformulation of Blau's Model", Sociological Methodology, 26 (1996): 193–225.
- "Rationality and the Framing of Religious Choices", with Mark Chaves, Journal for the Scientific Study of Religion, 35 (June 1996): 128–44.
- "Contemplations on the Economic Approach to Religious Behavior", American Economic Review Papers and Proceedings, '86 (May 1996): 443-447.
- "The Dynamics of the Religious Economy: Exit, Voice, and Denominational Secularization", Rationality and Society, 8 (February 1996): 81–110.
- "Revisiting Tally's Corner: Mainstream Norms, Cognitive Dissonance, and Underclass Behavior", Rationality and Society, 6 (October 1994): 462–88.
