= Dyad (sociology) =

Group of two people

In sociology, a dyad is a group of two people, the smallest possible social group. As an adjective, "dyadic" describes their interaction. The pair of individuals in a dyad can be linked via romantic interest, family relation, interests, work, partners in crime, and so on. The relation can be based on equality, but may be based on an asymmetrical or hierarchical relationship (master–servant). The strength of the relationship is evaluated on the basis of time the individuals spend together, as well as on the emotional intensity of their relationship. The term dyad is from Ancient Greek δυάς (duás) 'pair'.

A dyad can be unstable because both persons must cooperate to make it work. If one of the two fails to complete their duties, the group would fall apart. Because of the significance of marriages in society, their stability is very important. For this reason, marital dyads are often enforced through legal, economic, and religious laws.

Dyadic friendships refer to the most immediate and concrete level of peer interaction, which is expanded to include new forms of relationships in adolescence – most notably, romantic and sexual relationships. Already Ferdinand Tönnies treated it as a special pattern of gemeinschaft, 1887, as community of spirit.

The term can also be used to describe two groups or two countries.

== Meaning ==
Dyad means two things of similar kind or nature or group, and dyadic communication means the interrelationship between the two. In practice, this relationship refers to dialogic relations or face-to-face verbal communication between two people involving their mutual ideas, thought, behavior, ideals, liking, disliking, and the queries and answers concerning life and living in nature. A sudden communication between two strangers in the street and not continued afterwards or not having lasting aftereffect on each other can not be termed as dyadic communication. Examples of dyadic communication occur between Jesus and Peter, the Buddha and Ananda, or between Socrates and Plato, where dialog is not only outward, superficial, or mechanical, but instead brings the two people into a sphere where each person influences the other.

A lasting communication of ideas between two people for long duration of time or of any intensive duration of deeper impact may be called dyadic communication.

== See also ==
- Antipositivism
- Duocentric social network
- Ideal type
- Normal type
- Pas de deux
- Reflexivity (social theory)
- Social action
- Social relation
- Structure and agency
- Triad (sociology)
