= David Krackhardt =

David Krackhardt is Professor of Organizations at Heinz College and the Tepper School of Business, with courtesy appointments in the Department of Social and Decision Sciences (Dietrich College of Humanities and Social Sciences) and the Machine Learning Department (School of Computer Science), all at Carnegie Mellon University in the United States, and he also serves a Fellow of CEDEP, the European Centre for Executive Education, in France. He is notable for being the author of KrackPlot, a network visualization software designed for social network analysis which is widely used in academic research. He is also the founder of the Journal of Social Structure.

== Career ==
Krackhardt received a BS degree from the Massachusetts Institute of Technology and a PhD from the University of California, Irvine. He joined the Johnson School of Management at Cornell as an assistant professor in 1984. He moved to Harvard Business School as a Marvin Bower Fellow for a year, before joining Heinz College in 1991. He has held visiting faculty positions at the University of Chicago, INSEAD, and the University of Bocconi in Italy.

== Work ==
Krackhardt developed and showed the consequences of “cognitive social structures”, which capture how networks are perceived in a social environment. He created the E-I index, which describes the extent to which an organization is either silo-like or integrated in its informal structure and demonstrated how these structures affect an organization’s ability to deal with crises. He also developed a set of graph theory-based measures of informal organizations for assessing an organization’s ability to confront a variety of strategic issues. In social network theory, perhaps he is best known for his concepts of “Philos ties” and the “Simmelian tie”, which underscore the importance of, respectively, tie content and the local context in which network relations occur. Methodologically, his major contribution has been the development of the Multiple Regression Quadratic Assignment Procedure (MRQAP), a non-parametric approach to statistical analysis of network data.

== Selected publications ==
Books

- Interpersonal Networks in Organizations: Cognition, Personality, Dynamics, and Culture, with Martin Kilduff, CUP (Structural Analysis in the Social Sciences), 2008. ISBN 0-521-86660-X

Articles

- Krackhardt, D. (1987). Cognitive Social Structures. Social Networks, 9: 109-134.
- Krackhardt, D. (1990). Assessing the Political Landscape: Structure, Cognition and Power in Organizations. Administrative Science Quarterly, 35:342-369.
- Krackhardt, D., & R. Stern (1988). Informal Networks and Organizational Crises: An Experimental Simulation. Social Psychology Quarterly, 51:123-140.
- Krackhardt, D. (1992). The Strength of Strong Ties: The Importance of Philos in Organizations. In N. Nohria & R. Eccles (eds.), Networks and Organizations: Structure, Form, and Action. Boston: Harvard Business School Press, pp. 216–239.
- Krackhardt, D. (1999). The Ties that Torture: Simmelian Tie Analysis in Organizations. Research in the Sociology of Organizations, 16:183-210.
- Krackhardt, D. & M. Kilduff (1999). Whether Close or Far: Perceptions of Balance in Friendship Networks in Organizations. Journal of Personality and Social Psychology, 76:770-782.
- Tortoriello, M., & D. Krackhardt (2010). Activating Cross-Boundary Knowledge: The Role of Simmelian Ties in the Generation of Innovations. Academy of Management Journal, 53:167-181.

== See also ==
- Krackhardt kite graph
