= Structural fold =

Cohesive group whose membership overlaps with that of another cohesive group

Structural folding is the network property of a cohesive group whose membership overlaps with that of another cohesive group. The idea reaches back to Georg Simmel's argument that individuality itself might be the product of unique intersection of network circles.

== Network structures in the business world ==
It has been proposed that successful firms often cluster together in cohesive groups, as dense ties among the group members reduce transaction cost by providing a basis for trust and coordination amongst the firms. Cohesive ties also enable the firms to implement projects beyond their capacity and cushions them against great uncertainty

However, another logic suggests that business groups might choose to forgo high density within the group in favour of maintaining some weaker ties to other firms outside the group. This way firms can reduce redundant ties and form long-distance links to other firms who can provide novel information to them. This logic rests on the assumption that the conservatizing strategy of in-group cohesion is maladaptive as it risks locking the businesses into early success and strategies, which in the absence of new information can easily become detrimental in a rapidly changing business environment.

A third, different, strategy would be to combine the benefits of the previous two. Such solutions can be termed either “closure and brokerage” or “cohesion and connectivity” and the benefits of the complementarity of these distinctive network features is common to them, especially for entrepreneurship. Actors at structural folds are multiple insiders, benefiting from dense cohesive ties that provide familiarity with the operations of the members in their group. However, due to being part of more than one group they also have access to diverse information. This combination of familiarity and diversity facilitates innovation and creative success through recombining resources.

== Intercohesion ==
Intercohesion is a distinctive network structure built from intersecting cohesive groups. It rests on the theoretical principle that cohesive group structures are not necessarily exclusive, but network structures can actually be cohesive and overlapping. This idea originates from Georg Simmel's who, in one of his works, argued that a person is often a member of more than one cohesive group in the same time, and these multiple group memberships are part of both individuation and social integration of the person. Intercohesion thus refers to mutually interpenetrating, cohesive structures, while the resulting distinctive network position at the intersection is a structural fold.

== Innovation ==
As actors at structural folds can be considered multiple insiders, who benefit from both dense cohesive ties that provide familiarity with the operations of the members in their group and from access to non-redundant information, they are believed to be in a better position for innovation and creative success. Based on the Schumpeterian understanding of the term, entrepreneurship is conceptualised as knowledge production through recombination, rather than just importing new ideas. Thus, actors at structural folds occupy a privileged position for successful innovation and creativity. On the one hand, they are part of a cohesive group that provides deeply familiar access to knowledge bases and productive resources, which are essential for generative recombination. On the other hand, they also have the opportunity to interact across different groups and have access to a diverse set of sources, which are also considered key for innovative recombination of already existing resource. Vedres and Stark (2010) in their study indeed found that structural folding contributed to higher performance of business groups.

Moreover, entrepreneurship also has dynamic properties along the temporal dimension. As Schumpeter observed entrepreneurship also brings along what he called creative destruction. Applied to network analytical terms, structural folding may in fact destabilise groups as overlapping membership can disrupt group coordination and reciprocal trust. On an empirical level, it was found that in the case of Hungarian businesses, groups with more structural folds are more likely to break up, and when they do so they are likely to fragment into smaller groups.

== Creativity ==
It has also been argued that structural folding also contributes to creative success in the case of cultural products especially, when the overlapping groups are cognitively distant. For creative innovation, teams need to have a diversity of stylistic elements for recombination. In cultural fields, where teams periodically assemble, dissolve and reassemble the knowledge base of team resides in the previous experience of its members with various styles. Cognitively diverse groups held in tension by structural folds have both a greater repertoire of action and the ability to recontextualize knowledge. Thus, structural folding improves the likelihood of creative success and innovation by increasing the possibility to override things that are taken for granted and to think more reflexively. Therefore cognitively distant but overlapping cohesive group structures are productive because of the mixing, ambiguities and tensions they encounter.
