= Normal type =

Normal type (in German: Normaltyp) is a typological term in sociology coined by the German sociologist Ferdinand Tönnies (1855–1936). It can be considered both as a forerunner of, and a challenge to, the rather better known concept of Max Weber’s: the ideal type (in German Idealtyp).

== Tönnies’ distinctions ==
Tönnies drew a sharp line between the realm of conceptualization (of sociological terms, including ‘normal types’) and the realm of reality (of social action). The first must be treated axiomatically and in a deductive way (pure sociology); the second, empirically and in an inductive way (applied sociology). Following Tönnies, reality (the second realm) cannot be explained without concepts, which belong to the first realm, or else you will fail because you try to define x by something derived from x.

Tönnies’ Normaltyp was thus a conceptual tool created on a logical basis, an almost mathematical concept always open to subsequent refinement from a confrontation with the empirical evidence.

The contrast with Weber's ‘ideal type’ came from the latter's ‘accentuation’ of certain elements of a real social process, which is under sociological (or historical) scrutiny - “the one-sided accentuation of one or more points of view ... of a great many diffuse, discrete, more or less present and occasionally absent concrete individual phenomena”, as Weber himself put it. From Tönnies’ point of view, an ideal type cannot explain reality, because it is derived from reality by accentuation, but might help to understand reality.

The normal type moved from abstract to concrete; the ideal type from concrete to abstract.

== Weber's survival ==
Nevertheless, Weber's term survived in the sociological community, since his Idealtyp helped to understand social forces, and for him sociology had both to explain and to understand things – a daring combination, but successful in the eyes of many sociologists.

== See also ==
- Georg Simmel
- Structure and agency
