= Balance theory =

Theory of attitude change

In the psychology of motivation, balance theory is a theory of attitude change, proposed by Fritz Heider. It conceptualizes the cognitive consistency motive as a drive toward psychological balance. The consistency motive is the urge to maintain one's values and beliefs over time. Heider proposed that "sentiment" or liking relationships are balanced if the affect valence in a system multiplies out to a positive result.

Research in 2020 provided neuroscientific evidence supporting Heider's balance theory. A study using neuroimaging techniques found distinct differences in brain activation when individuals were exposed to unbalanced versus balanced triads. These differences were observed in brain regions associated with processing cognitive dissonance, offering biological support for Heider's original psychological explanation of balance theory in social context.

Structural balance theory in social network analysis is the extension proposed by Dorwin Cartwright and Frank Harary. It was the framework for the discussion at a Dartmouth College symposium in September 1975.

== P-O-X model ==
Heider's P-O-X model

For example: a Person ($P$) who likes ($+$) an Other ($O$) person will be balanced by the same valence attitude on behalf of the other. Symbolically, $P (+) > O$ and $P < (+) O$ results in psychological balance.

This can be extended to things or objects ($X$) as well, thus introducing triadic relationships. If a person $P$ likes object $X$ but dislikes other person $O$, what does $P$ feel upon learning that person $O$ created the object $X$? This is symbolized as such:

- $P (+) > X$
- $P (-) > O$
- $O (+) > X$

Cognitive balance is achieved when there are three positive links or two negatives with one positive. Two positive links and one negative like the example above creates imbalance or cognitive dissonance.

Multiplying the signs shows that the person will perceive imbalance (a negative multiplicative product) in this relationship, and will be motivated to correct the imbalance somehow. The Person can either:

- Decide that $O$ isn't so bad after all,
- Decide that $X$ isn't as great as originally thought, or
- Conclude that $O$ couldn't really have made $X$.

Any of these will result in psychological balance, thus resolving the dilemma and satisfying the drive. (Person $P$ could also avoid object $X$ and other person $O$ entirely, lessening the stress created by psychological imbalance.)

To predict the outcome of a situation using Heider's balance theory, one must weigh the effects of all the potential results, and the one requiring the least amount of effort will be the likely outcome.

Determining if the triad is balanced is simple math:

$+ + + = +$; Balanced.

$- + - = +$; Balanced.

$- + + = -$; Unbalanced.

== Examples ==
Balance theory is useful in examining how celebrity endorsement affects consumers' attitudes toward products. If a person likes a celebrity and perceives (due to the endorsement) that said celebrity likes a product, said person will tend to like the product more, in order to achieve psychological balance.

However, if the person already had a dislike for the product being endorsed by the celebrity, they may begin disliking the celebrity, again to achieve psychological balance.

Heider's balance theory can explain why holding the same negative attitudes of others promotes closeness. See The enemy of my enemy is my friend.

== Signed graphs and social networks ==
Dorwin Cartwright and Frank Harary looked at Heider's triads as 3-cycles in a signed graph. The sign of a path in a graph is the product of the signs of its edges. They considered cycles in a signed graph representing a social network.

A balanced signed graph has only cycles of positive sign.

Harary proved that a balanced graph is polarized, that is, it decomposes into two entirely positive subgraphs that are joined by negative edges.

In the interest of realism, a weaker property was suggested by Davis:

No cycle has exactly one negative edge.

Graphs with this property may decompose into more than two entirely positive subgraphs, called clusters. The property has been called the clusterability axiom. Then balanced graphs are recovered by assuming the

Parsimony axiom: The subgraph of positive edges has at most two components.

The significance of balance theory for social dynamics was expressed by Anatol Rapoport:

The hypothesis implies roughly that attitudes of the group members will tend to change in such a way that one's friends' friends will tend to become one's friends and one's enemies' enemies also one's friends, and one's enemies' friends and one's friends' enemies will tend to become one's enemies, and moreover, that these changes tend to operate even across several removes (one's friends' friends' enemies' enemies tend to become friends by an iterative process).

Note that a triangle of three mutual enemies makes a clusterable graph but not a balanced one. Therefore, in a clusterable network one cannot conclude that "the enemy of my enemy is my friend," although this aphorism is a fact in a balanced network.

=== Criticism ===
Claude Flament expressed a limit to balance theory imposed by reconciling weak ties with relationships of stronger force such as family bonds:

One might think that a valued algebraic graph is necessary to represent psycho-social reality, if it is to take into account the degree of intensity of interpersonal relationships. But in fact it then seems hardly possible to define the balance of a graph, not for mathematical but for psychological reasons. If the relationship AB is +3, the relationship BC is –4, what should the AC relationship be in order that the triangle be balanced? The psychological hypotheses are wanting, or rather they are numerous and little justified.

At the 1975 Dartmouth College colloquium on balance theory, Bo Anderson struck at the heart of the notion:

In graph theory there exists a formal balance theory that contains theorems that are analytically true. The statement that Heider's psychological balance can be represented, in its essential aspects, by a suitable interpretation of that formal balance theory should, however, be regarded as problematical. We cannot routinely identify the positive and negative lines in the formal theory with the positive and negative "sentiment relations", and identify the formal balance notion with the psychological idea of balance or structural tension. .. It is puzzling that the fine structure of the relationships between formal and psychological balance has been given scant attention by balance theorists.

== See also ==
- Information integration theory
- Social balance theory
