= Formal organization =

Organization with a fixed set of rules of intra-organization procedures and structures

A formal organization is an organization with a fixed set of rules of intra-organization procedures and structures. As such, it is usually set out in writing, with a language of rules that ostensibly leaves little discretion for interpretation.

Sociologist Max Weber devised a model of formal organization known as the bureaucratic model that is based on the rationalization of activities through standards and procedures. It is one of the most applied formal organization models.

In some societies and in some organizations, such rules may be strictly followed; In others, they may be little more than an empty formalism.

- To facilitate the accomplishment of the goals of the organization: In a formal organization, the work is delegated to each individual of the organization. He/She works towards the attainment of definite goals, which are in compliance with the goals of the organization.
- To facilitate the co-ordination of various activities: The authority, responsibility, and accountability of individuals in the organization are very well defined. Hence, facilitating the co-ordination of various activities of the organization very effectively.
- To aid the establishment of logical authority relationship: The responsibilities of the individuals in the organization are well defined. They have a definite place in the organization due to a well-defined hierarchical structure that is inherent in any formal organization.
- Permit the application of the concept of specialization and division of Labor. Division of work amongst individuals according to their capabilities helps in greater specializations and division of work.
- Incite a sense of group cohesiveness.

== Distinction from informal organization ==
Formal rules are often adapted to subjective interests—social structures within an enterprise and the personal goals, desires, sympathies and behaviors of the individual workers—so that the practical everyday life of an organization becomes informal. Practical experience shows no organization is ever completely rule-bound: instead, all real organizations represent some mix of formal and informal. Consequently, when attempting to legislate for an organization and to create a formal structure, it is necessary to recognize informal organization in order to create workable structures. However, informal organization can fail, or, if already set in order, can work against mismanagement.

Formal organizations are typically understood to be systems of coordinated and controlled activities that arise when work is embedded in complex networks of technical relations and boundary-spanning exchanges. But in modern societies, formal organizational structures arise in highly institutional contexts. Organizations are driven to incorporate the practices and procedures defined by prevailing rationalized concepts of organizational work and institutionalized in society. Organizations that do so increase their legitimacy and their survival prospects, independent of the immediate efficacy of the acquired practices and procedures. There can develop a tension between on the one hand, the institutionalized products, services, techniques, policies, and programs that function as myths (and may be ceremonially adopted), and efficiency criteria on the other hand. To maintain ceremonial conformity, organizations that reflect institutional rules tend to buffer their formal structures from the uncertainties of the technical activities by developing a loose coupling between their formal structures and actual work activities. - (John Meyer and Brian Rowan, 1976)

== Identification numbers and public registers ==
In some countries, formal organizations are registered in public registers to make their identification easier even if an organization renames.

Examples of organization identifiers:

- VAT identification number - usually only organizations that are tax-payers (companies)
- Czech Republic: Identifikační číslo organizace
- Germany: Wirtschafts-Identifikationsnummer
- Poland: REGON (Rejestr Gospodarki Narodowej)
- Brazil: CNPJ

== The Hawthorne experiments ==
The deviation from rule-making on a higher level was documented for the first time in the Hawthorne studies (1924–1932) and called informal organization. At first this discovery was dismissed as the product of avoidable errors, until it finally had to be recognized that these unwritten laws of work of everyday life often had more influence on the fate of the enterprise than those conceived on organizational charts of the executive level. Numerous empirical studies in sociological organization research followed, ever more clearly providing evidence for this, particularly during the human relations movement. It is important to analyze informal structures within an enterprise to make use of positive innovations, but also to be able to do away with bad habits that have developed over time.

== Reasons for informal organization ==
There are many different reasons for informal organization:

- Informal standards: personal goals and interests of workers differ from official organizational goals.
- Informal communication: changes of communication routes within an enterprise due to personal relations between coworkers.
- Informal group: certain groups of coworkers have the same interests, or (for example) the same origin.
- Informal leaders: due to charisma and general popularity, certain members of the organization win more influence than originally intended.
- Different interests and preferences of coworkers.
- Different status of coworkers.
- Difficult work requirements.
- Non-satisfactory conditions of work.

Managerial organization theory often still regards informal organization as rather disturbing, but sometimes helpful. In the opinion of systems theory and cybernetics, however, formal organization fades into the background and only serves, if necessary, to supplement or to correct. Changes in structure always redevelop because of the conduct and differences among coworkers, and the ability of self-organization is recognized as a natural characteristic of a social system.
