= Information technology =

Computer-based technologies

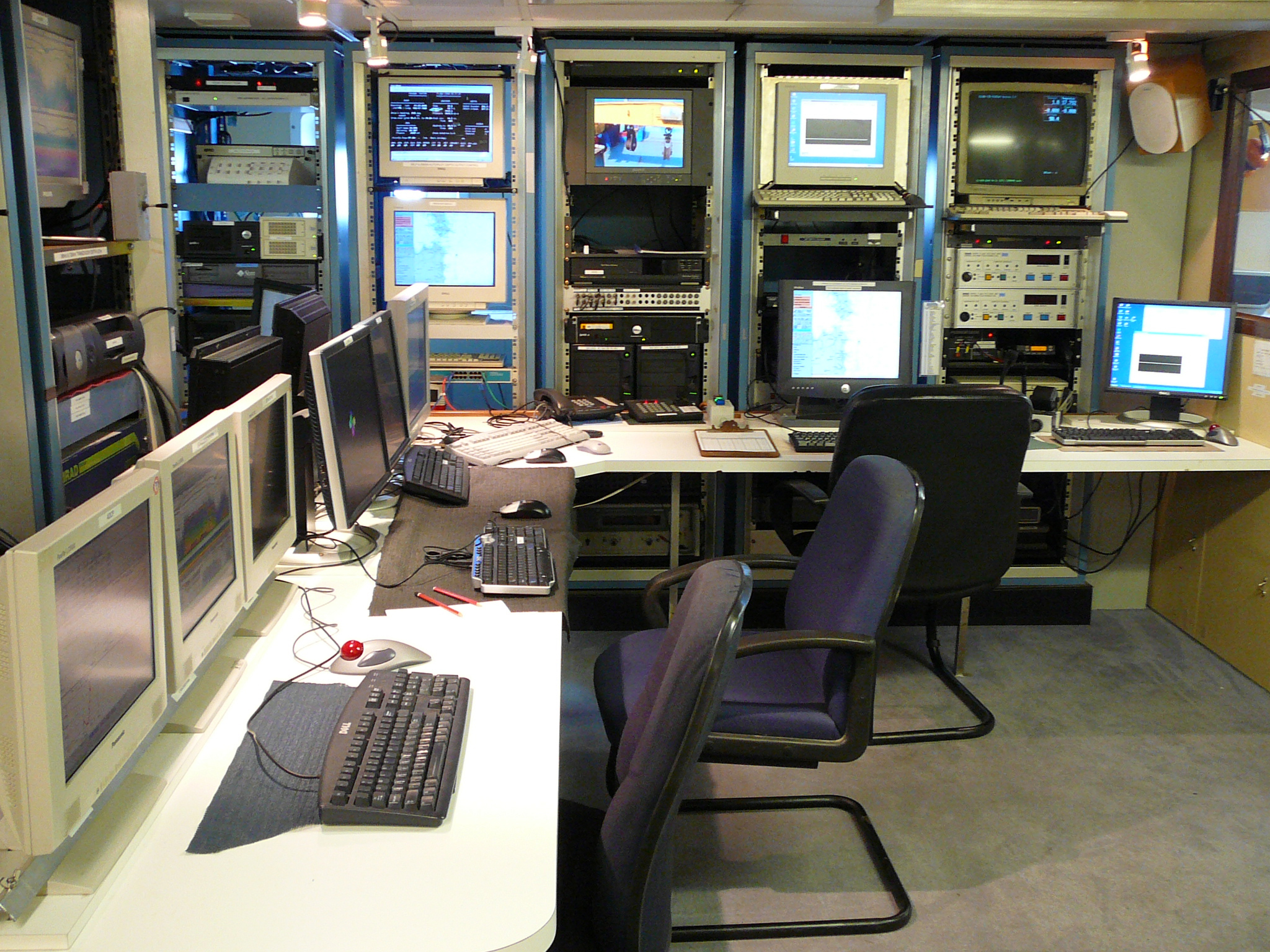
A computer lab contains a wide range of information technology elements, including hardware, software and storage systems.

Information technology (IT) is the study or use of computers, telecommunication systems and other devices to create, process, store, retrieve and transmit information. While the term is commonly used to refer to computers and computer networks, it also encompasses other information distribution technologies such as television and telephones. Information technology is an application of computer science and computer engineering.

An information technology system (IT system) is generally an information system, a communications system, or, more specifically speaking, a computer system — including all hardware, software, and peripheral equipment — operated by a limited group of IT users, and an IT project usually refers to the commissioning and implementation of an IT system. IT systems play a vital role in facilitating efficient data management, enhancing communication networks, and supporting organizational processes across various industries. Successful IT projects require meticulous planning and ongoing maintenance to ensure optimal functionality and alignment with organizational objectives.Information technology support and operations involve maintaining computer systems, fixing hardware and software problems, and helping users with technical issues. Many organizations depend on IT support teams to keep their technology working properly. These teams may handle tasks such as installing software, managing user accounts, troubleshooting network problems, and maintaining computer equipment. According to the National Institute of Standards and Technology (NIST), system support also includes documentation, maintenance, backups, and user assistance. These activities are important because problems with computer systems can affect an organization's daily operations and security.

Although humans have been storing, retrieving, manipulating, analysing and communicating information since the earliest writing systems were developed, the term information technology in its modern sense first appeared in a 1958 article published in the Harvard Business Review; authors Harold J. Leavitt and Thomas L. Whisler commented that "the new technology does not yet have a single established name. We shall call it information technology (IT)." Their definition consists of three categories: techniques for processing, the application of statistical and mathematical methods to decision-making, and the simulation of higher-order thinking through computer programs.

== History ==
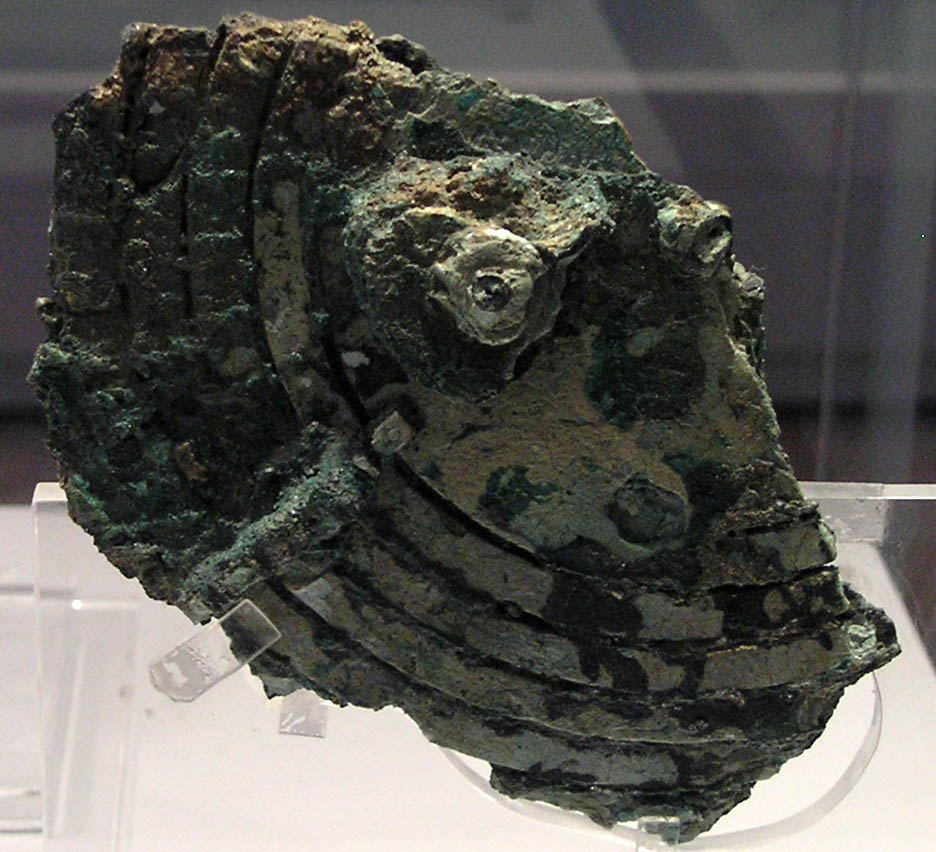
Antikythera mechanism, considered the first mechanical analog computer, dating back to the first century BC.

Based on the storage and processing technologies employed, it is possible to distinguish four distinct phases of IT development: pre-mechanical (3000 BC – 1450 AD), mechanical (1450 – 1840), electromechanical (1840 – 1940), and electronic (1940 to present).

Ideas of computer science were first mentioned before the 1950s under the Massachusetts Institute of Technology (MIT) and Harvard University, where they had discussed and began thinking of computer circuits and numerical calculations. As time went on, the field of information technology and computer science became more complex and was able to handle the processing of more data. Scholarly articles began to be published from different organizations.

During the mid-1900s, Alan Turing, J. Presper Eckert, and John Mauchly were some of the pioneers of early computer technology. While their main efforts focused on designing the first digital computer, Turing also began to raise questions about artificial intelligence.

Devices have been used to aid computation for thousands of years, probably initially in the form of a tally stick. The Antikythera mechanism, dating from about the beginning of the first century BC, is generally considered the earliest known mechanical analog computer, and the earliest known geared mechanism. Comparable geared devices did not emerge in Europe until the 16th century, and it was not until 1645 that the first mechanical calculator capable of performing the four basic arithmetical operations was developed.

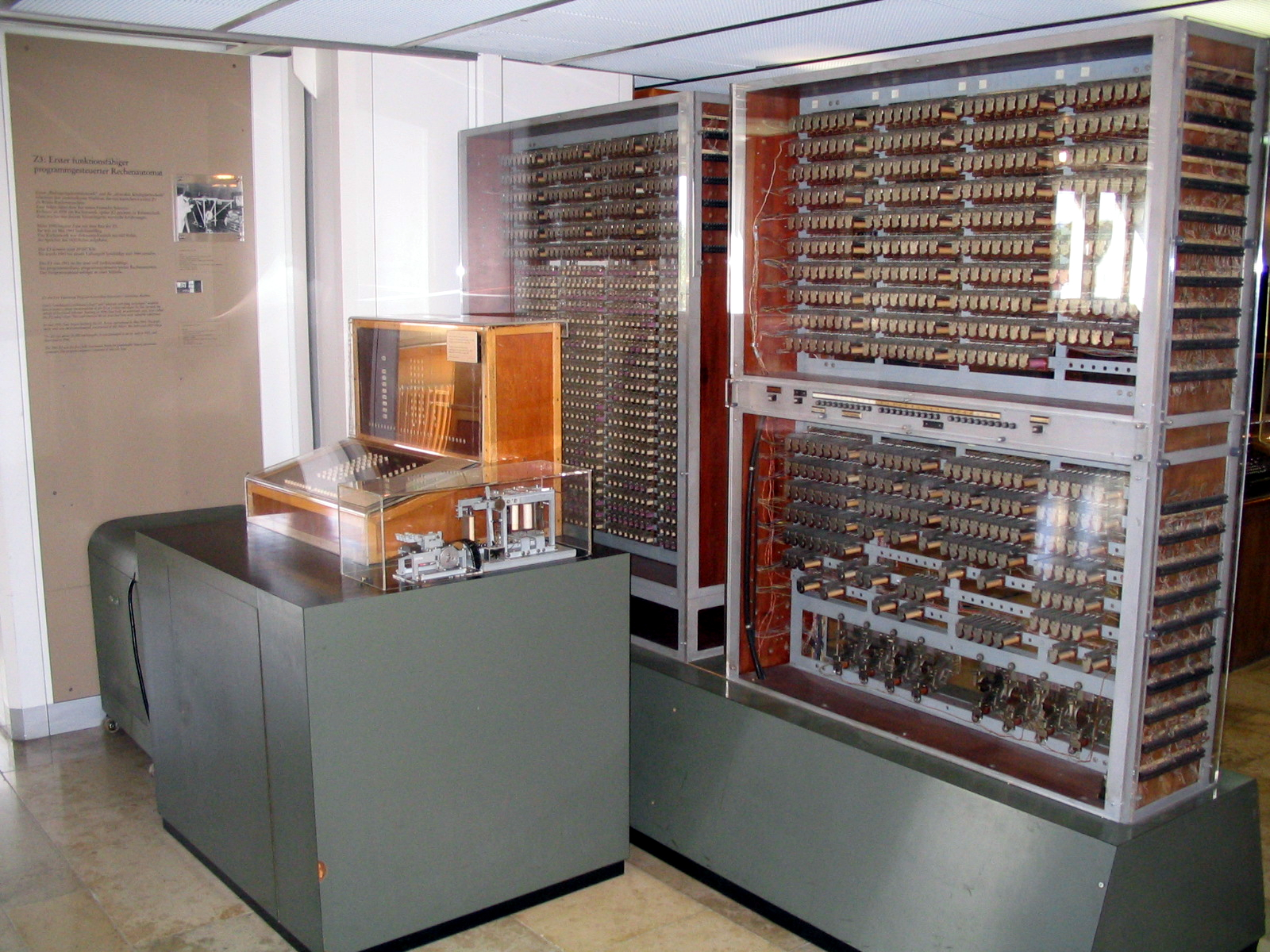
Zuse Z3 replica on display at Deutsches Museum in Munich. The Zuse Z3 is the first programmable computer.

Electronic computers, using either relays or thermionic valves, began to appear in the early 1940s. The electromechanical Zuse Z3, completed in 1941, was the world's first programmable computer, and by modern standards one of the first machines that could be considered a complete computing machine. During the Second World War, Colossus developed the first electronic digital computer to decrypt German messages. Although it was programmable, it was not general-purpose, being designed to perform only a single task. It could not also store its program in memory; programming was carried out using plugs and switches to alter the internal wiring. The first recognizably modern electronic digital stored-program computer was the Manchester Baby, which ran its first program on 21 June 1948.

The development of transistors in the late 1940s at Bell Laboratories allowed a new generation of computers to be designed with greatly reduced power consumption. The first commercially available stored-program computer, the Ferranti Mark I, contained 4050 valves and had a power consumption of 25 kilowatts. By comparison, the first transistorized computer developed at the University of Manchester and operational by November 1953, consumed only 150 watts in its final version.

Several other breakthroughs in semiconductor technology include the integrated circuit (IC) invented by Jack Kilby at Texas Instruments and Robert Noyce at Fairchild Semiconductor in 1959, silicon dioxide surface passivation by Carl Frosch and Lincoln Derick in 1955, the first planar silicon dioxide transistors by Frosch and Derick in 1957, the MOSFET demonstration by a Bell Labs team, the planar process by Jean Hoerni in 1959, and the microprocessor invented by Ted Hoff, Federico Faggin, Masatoshi Shima, and Stanley Mazor at Intel in 1971. These important inventions led to the development of the personal computer (PC) in the 1970s, and the emergence of information and communications technology (ICT).

By 1984, according to the National Westminster Bank Quarterly Review, the term information technology had been redefined as "the convergence of telecommunications and computing technology (...generally known in Britain as information technology)." We then begin to see the appearance of the term in 1990, contained within documents for the International Organization for Standardization (ISO).

Innovations in technology have already revolutionized the world by the twenty-first century as people have gained access to different online services. This has changed the workforce drastically, as thirty percent of U.S. workers were already in careers in this profession. 136.9 million people were personally connected to the Internet, which was equivalent to 51 million households. Along with the Internet, new types of technology were also being introduced across the globe, which have improved efficiency and made things easier across the globe.

As technology revolutionized society, millions of processes could be completed in seconds. Innovations in communication were crucial as people increasingly relied on computers to communicate via telephone lines and cable networks. The introduction of the email was considered revolutionary as "companies in one part of the world could communicate by e-mail with suppliers and buyers in another part of the world...".

Computers and technology have also revolutionized the marketing industry, resulting in more buyers of their products. In 2002, Americans exceeded $28 billion in goods just over the Internet alone, while e-commerce a decade later resulted in $289 billion in sales. And as computers are rapidly becoming more sophisticated by the day, they are becoming more widely used as people are becoming more reliant on them during the twenty-first century.

== Data processing ==
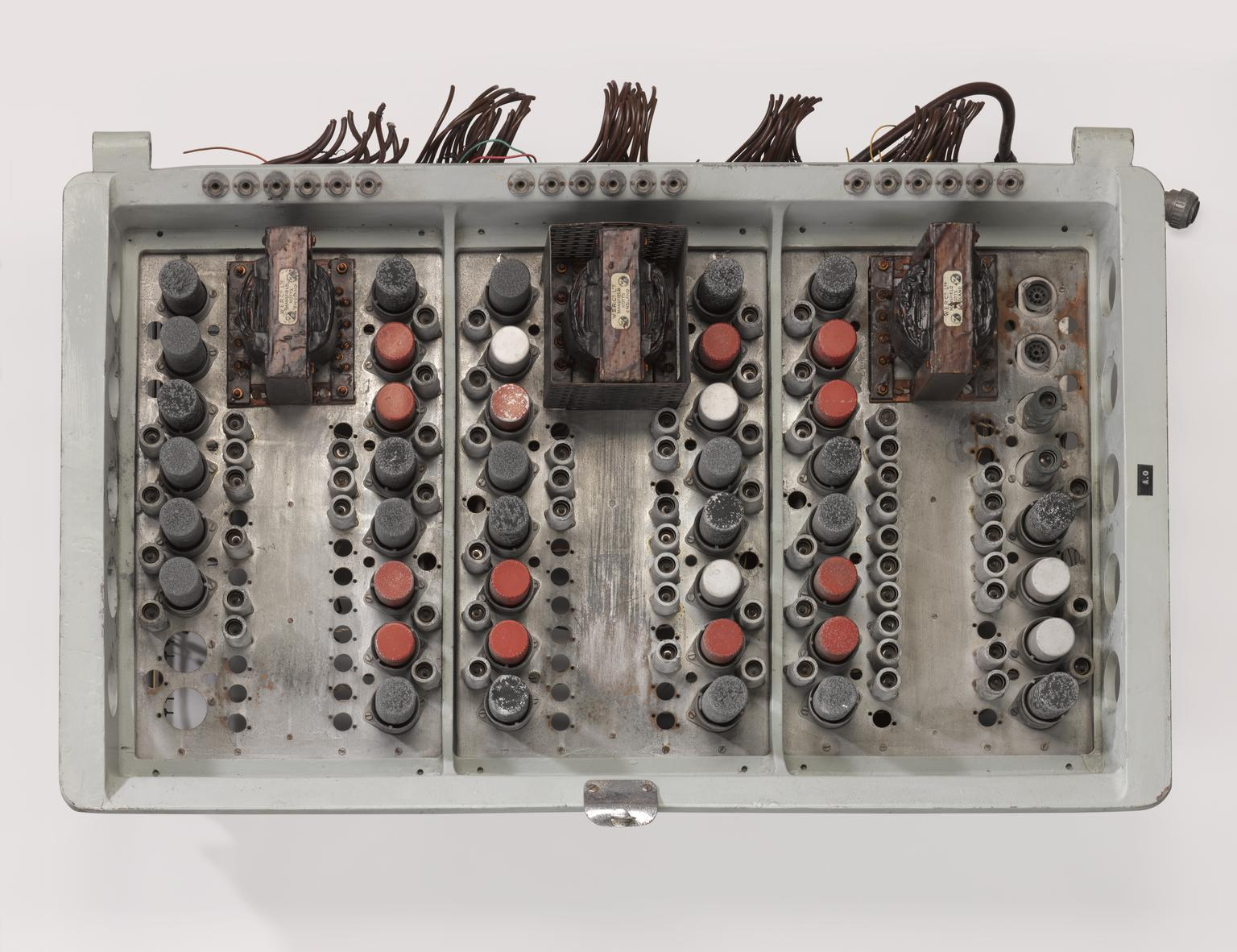
Ferranti Mark I computer logic board

Electronic data processing or business information processing can refer to the use of automated methods to process commercial data. Typically, this uses relatively simple, repetitive activities to process large volumes of similar information. For example: stock updates applied to an inventory, banking transactions applied to account and customer master files, booking and ticketing transactions to an airline's reservation system, and billing for utility services. The modifier "electronic" or "automatic" was used with "data processing" (DP), especially c. 1960, to distinguish human clerical data processing from that done by computer.

=== Storage ===
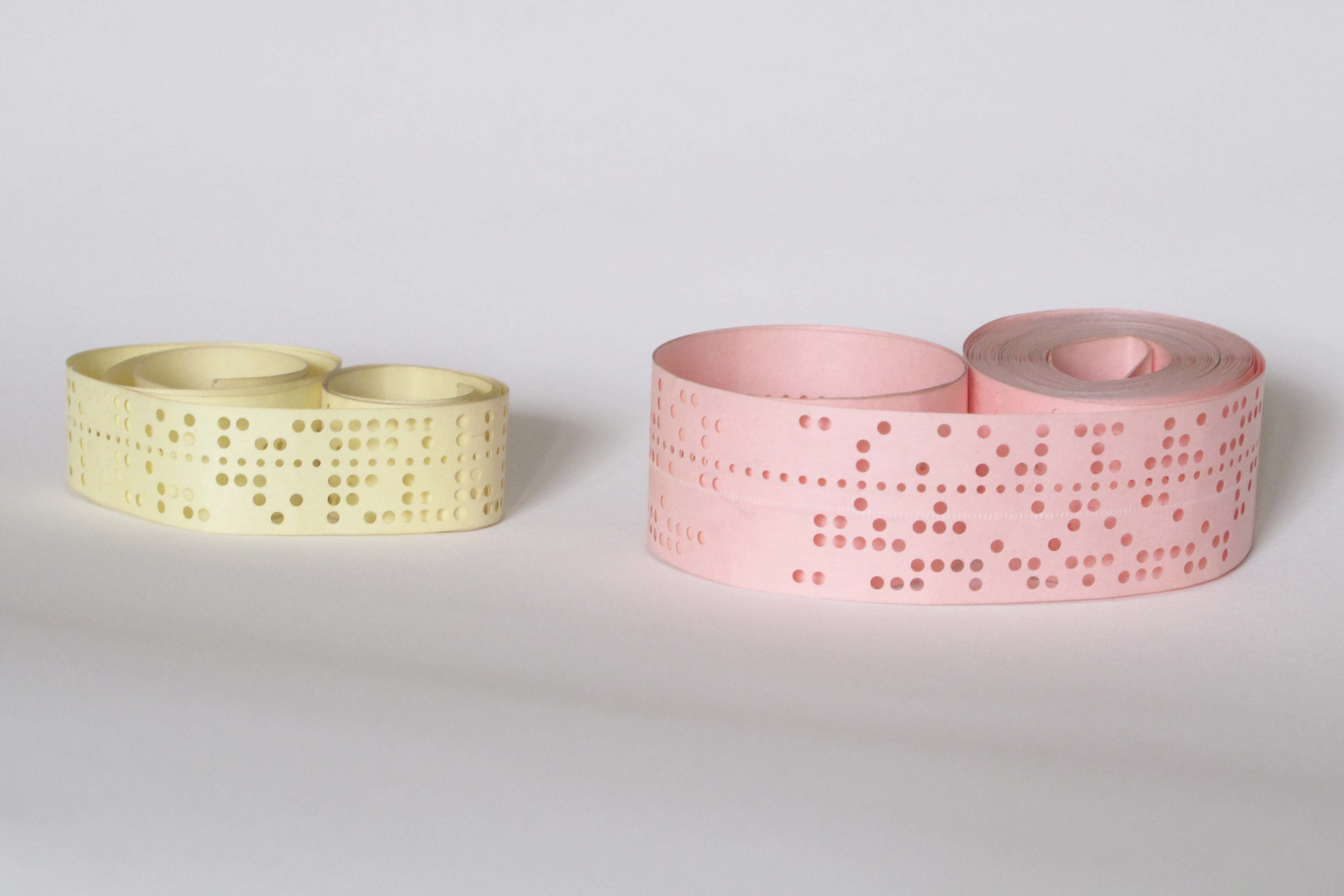
Punched tapes were used in early computers to store and represent data.

Early electronic computers such as Colossus made use of punched tape, a long strip of paper on which data was represented by a series of holes, a technology now obsolete. Electronic data storage, which is used in modern computers, dates from World War II, when a form of delay-line memory was developed to remove the clutter from radar signals, the first practical application of which was the mercury delay line. The first random-access digital storage device was the Williams tube, which was based on a standard cathode ray tube. However, the information stored in it and the delay-line memory was volatile in the fact that it had to be continuously refreshed, and thus was lost once power was removed. The earliest form of non-volatile computer storage was the magnetic drum, invented in 1932 and used in the Ferranti Mark 1, the world's first commercially available general-purpose electronic computer.

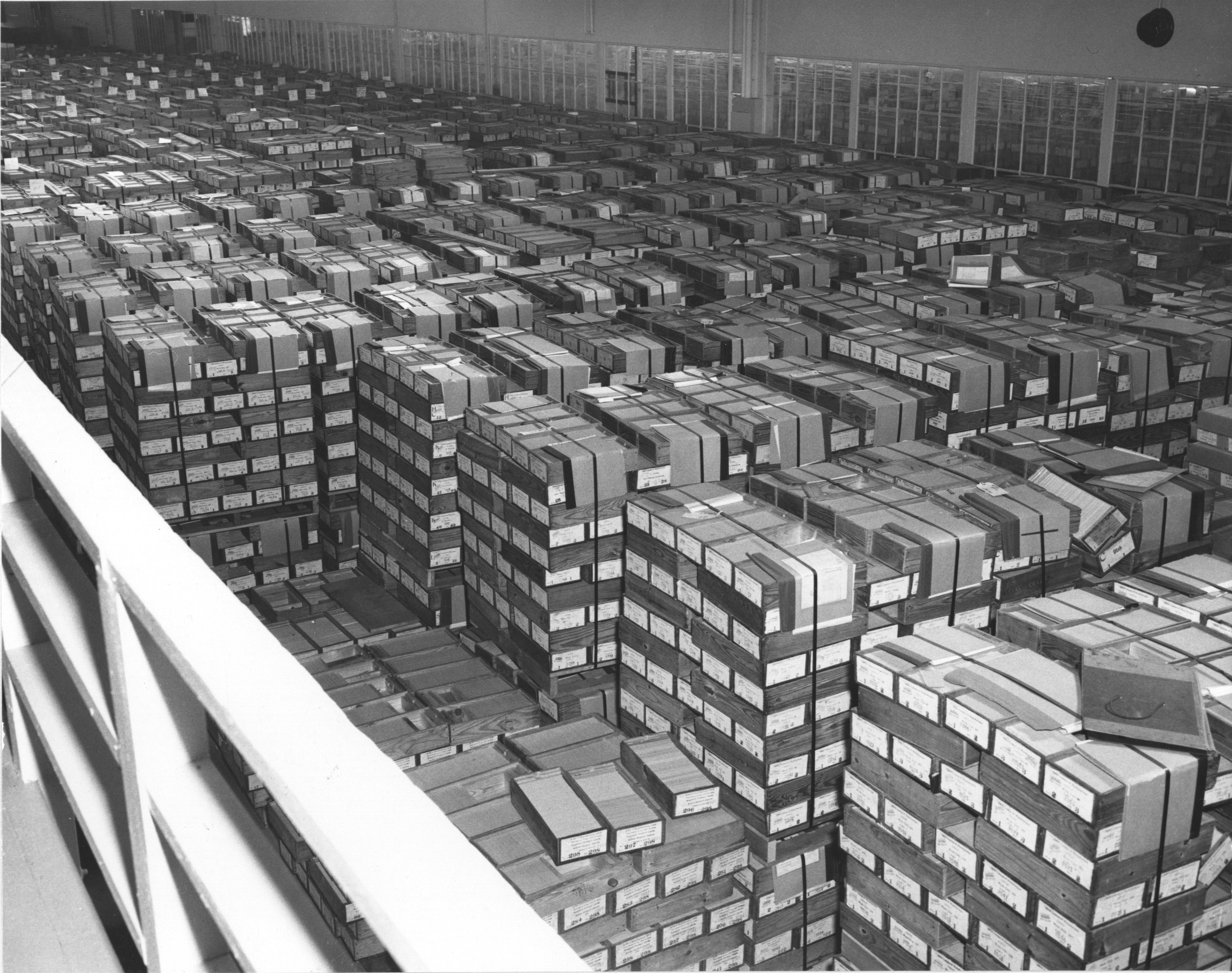
IBM card storage warehouse located in Alexandria, Virginia in 1959. This is where the United States government kept storage of punched cards.

IBM introduced the first hard disk drive in 1956, as a component of their 305 RAMAC computer system. Most digital data today is still stored magnetically on hard disks, or optically on media such as CD-ROMs. Until 2002, most information was stored on analog devices, but that year digital storage capacity exceeded analog for the first time. As of 2007, almost 94% of the data stored worldwide was held digitally: 52% on hard disks, 28% on optical devices, and 11% on digital magnetic tape. It has been estimated that the worldwide capacity to store information on electronic devices grew from less than 3 exabytes in 1986 to 295 exabytes in 2007, doubling roughly every 3 years.

==== Databases ====
Database Management Systems (DMS) emerged in the 1960s to address the problem of storing and retrieving large amounts of data accurately and quickly. An early such system was IBM's Information Management System (IMS), which is still widely deployed more than 50 years later. IMS stores data hierarchically, but in the 1970s Ted Codd proposed an alternative relational storage model based on set theory and predicate logic and the familiar concepts of tables, rows, and columns. In 1981, the first commercially available relational database management system (RDBMS) was released by Oracle.

All DMS consist of components; they allow the data they store to be accessed simultaneously by many users while maintaining its integrity. All databases have one common point in that the structure of the data they contain is defined and stored separately from the data itself, in a database schema.

In the late 2000s (decade), the extensible markup language (XML) became a popular format for data representation. Although XML data can be stored in normal file systems, it is commonly held in relational databases to take advantage of their "robust implementation verified by years of both theoretical and practical effort." As an evolution of the Standard Generalized Markup Language (SGML), XML's text-based structure offers the advantage of being both machine- and human-readable.

=== Transmission ===
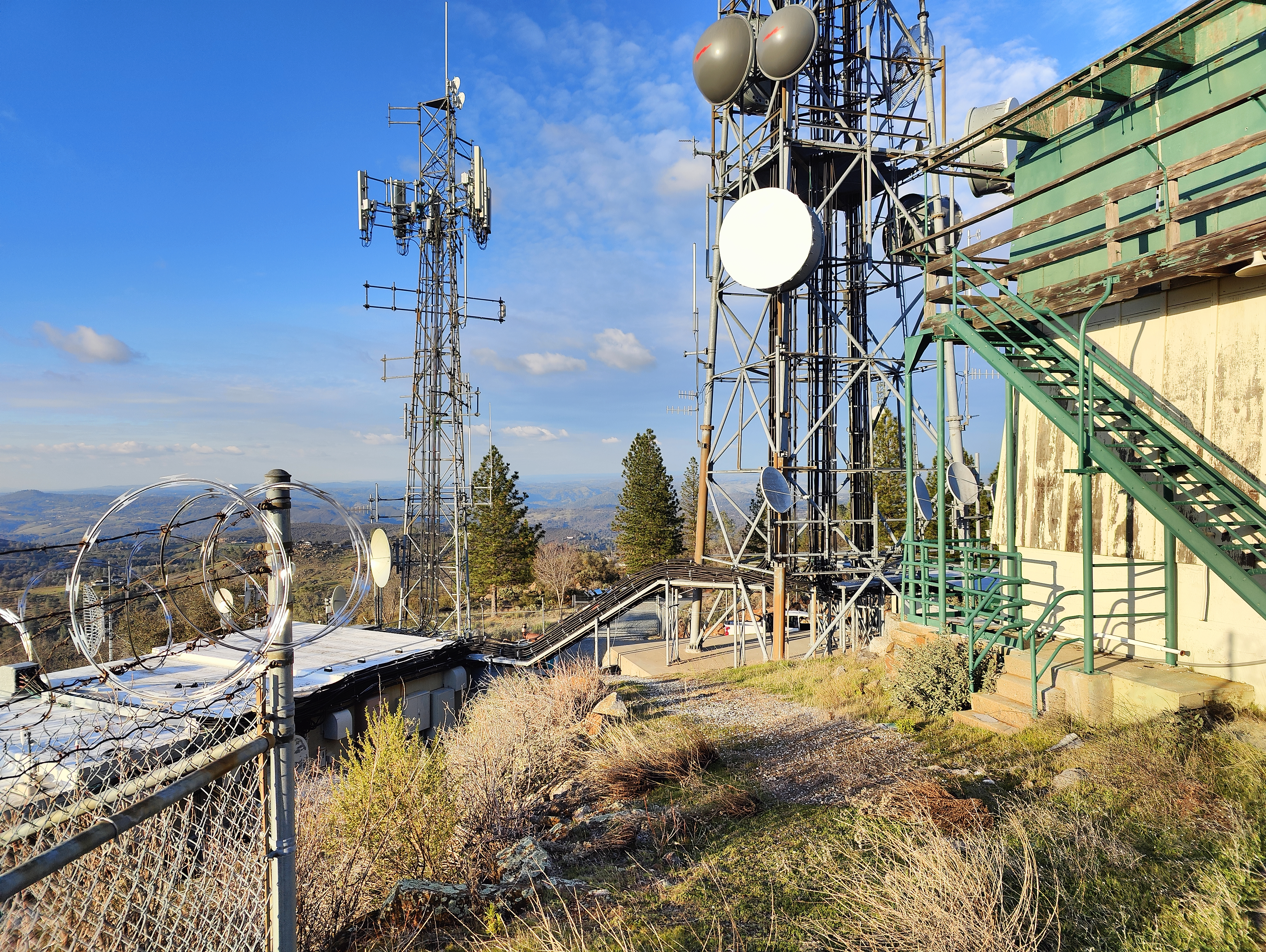
Radio towers at Pine Hill lookout

Data transmission has three aspects: transmission, propagation, and reception. It can be broadly categorized as broadcasting, in which information is transmitted unidirectionally downstream, or telecommunications, with bidirectional upstream and downstream channels.

XML has been increasingly employed as a means of data interchange since the early 2000s, particularly for machine-oriented interactions such as those involved in web-oriented protocols such as SOAP, describing "data-in-transit rather than... data-at-rest".

=== Manipulation ===
Hilbert and Lopez identify the exponential pace of technological change (a kind of Moore's law): machines' application-specific capacity to compute information per capita roughly doubled every 14 months between 1986 and 2007; the per capita capacity of the world's general-purpose computers doubled every 18 months during the same two decades; the global telecommunication capacity per capita doubled every 34 months; the world's storage capacity per capita required roughly 40 months to double (every 3 years); and per capita broadcast information has doubled every 12.3 years.

Massive amounts of data are stored worldwide every day, but unless it can be analyzed and presented effectively it essentially resides in what have been called data tombs: "data archives that are seldom visited". To address that issue, the field of data mining — "the process of discovering interesting patterns and knowledge from large amounts of data" — emerged in the late 1980s.

== Services ==
=== Email ===
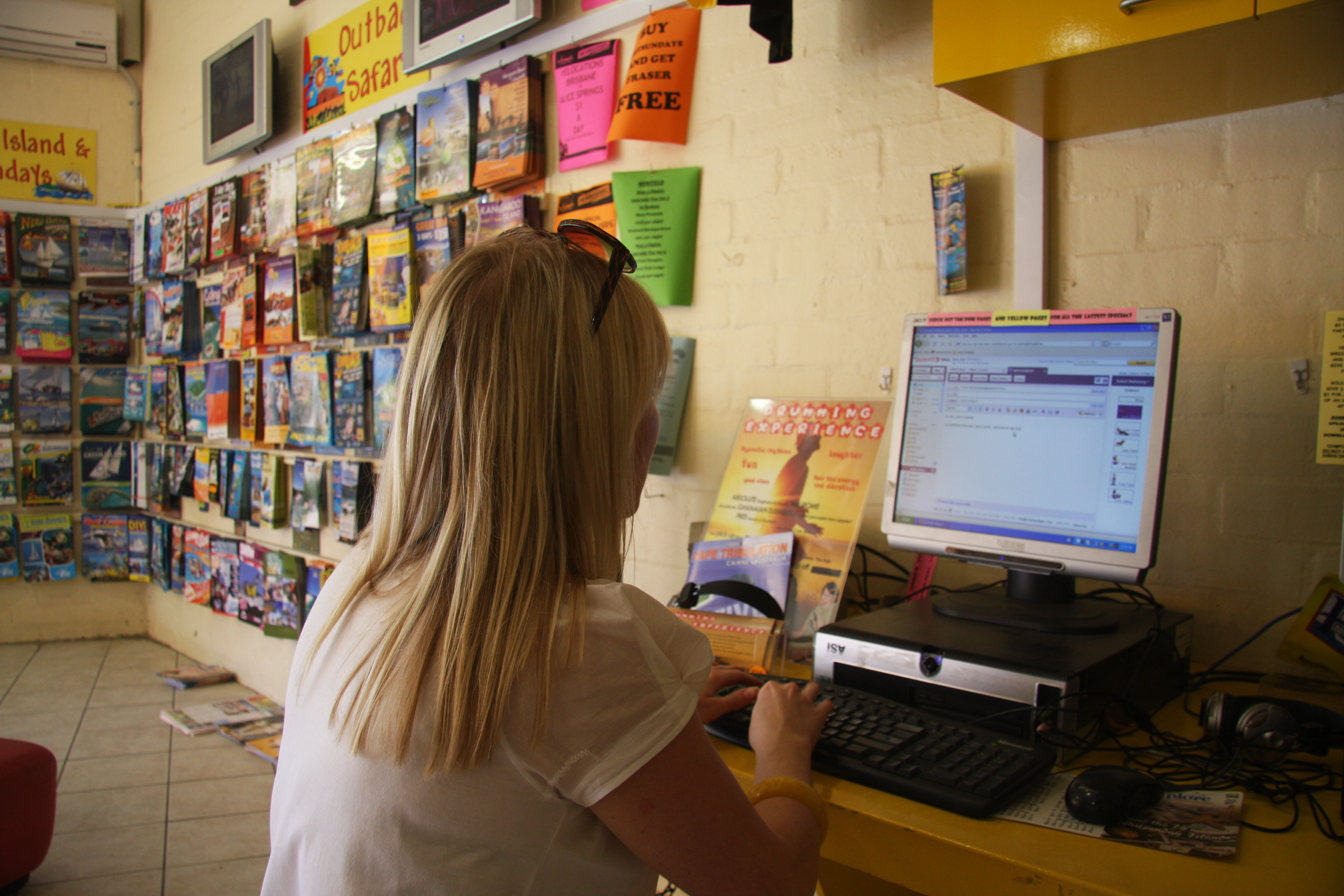
A woman sending an email at an internet cafe's public computer.

The technology and services IT provides for sending and receiving electronic messages (called "letters" or "electronic letters") over a distributed (including global) computer network. In terms of the composition of elements and the principle of operation, electronic mail practically repeats the system of regular (paper) mail, borrowing both terms (mail, letter, envelope, attachment, box, delivery, and others) and characteristic features — ease of use, message transmission delays, sufficient reliability, and at the same time no guarantee of delivery. The advantages of e-mail are: easily perceived and remembered by a person addresses of the form user_name@domain_name (for example, somebody@example.com); the ability to transfer both plain text and formatted, as well as arbitrary files; independence of servers (in the general case, they address each other directly); sufficiently high reliability of message delivery; ease of use by humans and programs.

The disadvantages of e-mail include the presence of such phenomena as spam (massive advertising and viral mailings); the theoretical impossibility of guaranteeing the delivery of a particular letter; possible delays in message delivery (up to several days); and limits on the size of a single message and on the total size of messages in a mailbox (which vary for individual users).

=== Search system ===
A search system is a software and hardware complex with a web interface that provides the ability to look for information on the Internet. A search engine usually means a site that hosts the interface (front-end) of the system. The software part of a search engine is a search engine (search engine) — a set of programs that provides the functionality of a search engine and is usually a trade secret of the search engine developer company. Most search engines look for information on World Wide Web sites, but some systems can look for files on FTP servers, items in online stores, and information on Usenet newsgroups. Improving search is one of the priorities of the modern Internet (see the Deep Web article about the main problems in the work of search engines).

== Commercial effects ==
Companies in the information technology field are often discussed as a group as the "tech sector" or the "tech industry." These titles can be misleading at times and should not be mistaken for "tech companies," which are generally large scale, for-profit corporations that sell consumer technology and software. From a business perspective, information technology departments are a "cost center" the majority of the time. A cost center is a department or staff that incurs expenses, or "costs," within a company rather than generating profits or revenue streams. Modern businesses rely heavily on technology for their day-to-day operations, so the expenses delegated to cover technology that facilitates business in a more efficient manner are usually seen as "just the cost of doing business." IT departments are allocated funds by senior leadership and must attempt to achieve the desired deliverables while staying within that budget. Government and the private sector might have different funding mechanisms, but the principles are more or less the same. This is an often overlooked reason for the rapid interest in automation and artificial intelligence, but the constant pressure to do more with less is opening the door for automation to take control of at least some minor operations in large companies.

Many companies now have IT departments for managing the computers, networks, and other technical areas of their businesses. Companies have also sought to integrate IT with business outcomes and decision-making through a BizOps or business operations department.

In a business context, the Information Technology Association of America has defined information technology as "the study, design, development, application, implementation, support, or management of computer-based information systems". The responsibilities of those working in the field include network administration, software development and installation, and the planning and management of an organization's technology life cycle, by which hardware and software are maintained, upgraded, and replaced.

=== Information services ===
Information services is a term somewhat loosely applied to a variety of IT-related services offered by commercial companies, as well as data brokers.

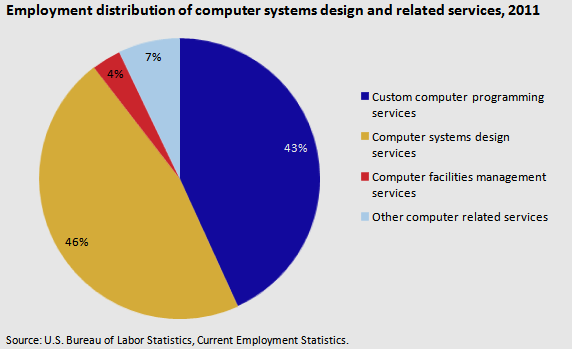
U.S. Employment distribution of computer systems design and related services, 2011

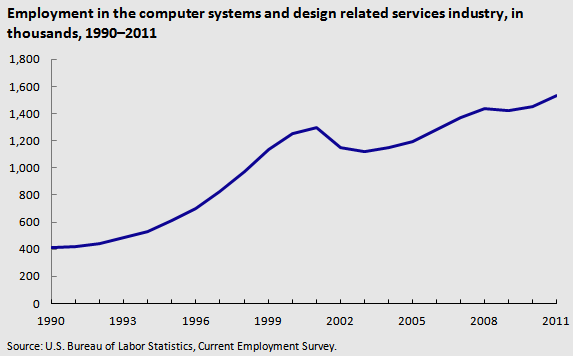
U.S. Employment in the computer systems and design-related services industry, in thousands, 1990–2011

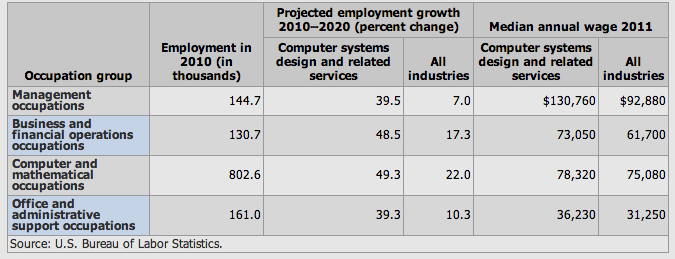
U.S. Occupational growth and wages in computer systems design and related services, 2010–2020

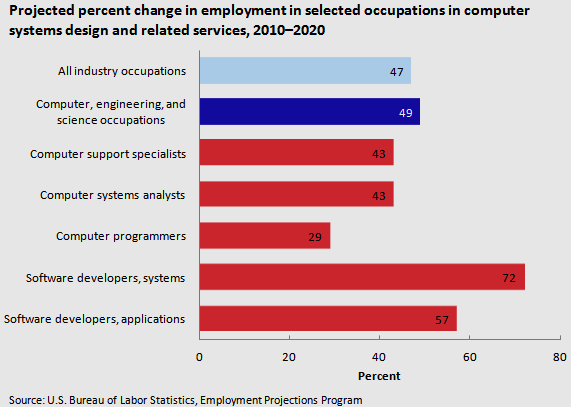
U.S. projected percent change in employment in selected occupations in computer systems design and related services, 2010–2020

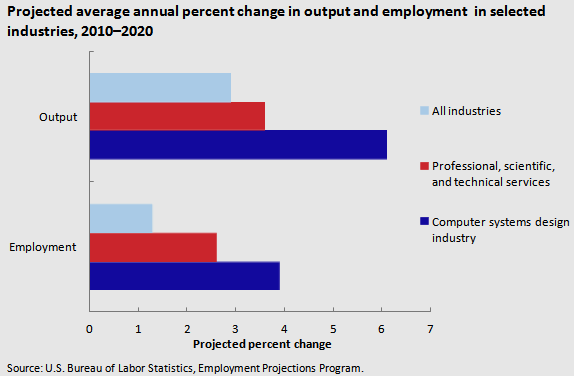
U.S. projected average annual percent change in output and employment in selected industries, 2010–2020

=== Ethics ===
The field of information ethics was established by mathematician Norbert Wiener in the 1940s. Some of the ethical issues associated with the use of information technology include:

- Breaches of copyright by those downloading files stored without the permission of the copyright holders
- Employers monitoring their employees' emails and other Internet usage
- Unsolicited emails
- Hackers accessing online databases
- Websites installing cookies or spyware to monitor a user's online activities, which may be used by data brokers

== IT projects ==
Research suggests that IT projects in business and public administration can easily become significant in scale. Research conducted by McKinsey in collaboration with the University of Oxford suggested that half of all large-scale IT projects (those with initial cost estimates of $15 million or more) often failed to maintain costs within their initial budgets or to complete on time.

== See also ==
- Information and communications technology (ICT)
- IT infrastructure
- Outline of information technology
- Knowledge society
- Automation
- Artificial intelligence
- Chatbot
- Robotics
- Information Age
- Fourth Industrial Revolution
- Information society
