= Alex Bavelas =

Psychosociologist (b. 1920)

- Born: Alexander Bavelas; December 26, 1913; Chicopee, Massachusetts, US
- Died: August 16, 1993 (aged 79); Sidney, British Columbia, Canada

Academic background
- Education: Massachusetts Institute of Technology
- Thesis: Some Mathematical Properties of Psychological Space (1948)
- Doctoral advisor: Dorwin Cartwright
- Influences: Kurt Lewin

Academic work
- Discipline: Psychology
- Sub-discipline: Social psychology
- Institutions: Massachusetts Institute of Technology; Stanford University
- Doctoral students: Harold Leavitt
- Notable ideas: Closeness centrality

Alexander Bavelas (December 26, 1913 – August 16, 1993) was an American psychosociologist credited as the first to define closeness centrality. His work was influential in using mathematics in developing the concept of centralization and in formalizing fundamental concepts of network structure.

== University of Iowa ==
As one of Kurt Lewin's first graduate students, Bavelas went to University of Iowa from Springfield College trained on group work. He suggested to Lewin a method of training people to be democratic, which would become the germ of extending autocracy-democracy studies to the field of industrial relations. At Lewin's suggestion, Bavelas sought to directly apply small group dynamics theory to labor-management relations by conducting small-group experiments at the Harwood Manufacturing Company in Virginia, known as Harwood research. In implementing a program of collaborative research in Harwood, he created and developed the `Echo approach' in the early 1940s. From 1940 to 1947, Bavelas and his successor John French were able to have many of Harwood's 600 workers and almost all of the managers in experiments. These proved to be successful in increasing worker productivity while maintaining good morale, and thus small-group research in industrial settings became Bavelas's forte.

== Move to Massachusetts Institute of Technology ==
Bavelas moved with Lewin from Iowa to MIT. He also used the Echo approach in studying Mennonite children.

Working in MIT the 1940s and 1950s, Bavelas used mathematics to formalize his theories on social networks. After Lewin's death in 1947, Bavelas stayed in MIT while many of Lewin's students transferred to the University of Michigan to create a new Center for Group Dynamics. In 1948, Bavelas obtained his PhD from MIT with Some Mathematical Properties of Psychological Space as his doctoral thesis with Dorwin Cartwright as his adviser. Years later, Frank Harary told Cartwright that Bavelas' PhD thesis showed an independent rediscovery of graph theory. In the late 1940s, Bavelas worked in the Industrial Relations section of MIT's Department of Economics & Social Science, then headed by Douglas McGregor. He founded the Group Networks Laboratory at MIT in 1948, which included mathematician R. Duncan Luce and social psychologist Leon Festinger.

== Bavelas experiments ==
Bavelas designed studies focused on information diffusion within a small group and on network structures that affect the speed and efficiency of this information diffusion. Bavelas and his students—particularly Harold Leavitt—conducted experiments on the effect of organizational structure on productivity and morale. In these experiments, small groups were given a task to complete, and then the communication structure was altered to determine if performance would be affected by a modification in the group structure.

These experiments would be known as the 'Bavelas experiments' and would be described as social psychology experiments using five-person groups with four communication networks—a wheel, chain, Y-formation, and a circle. Results from the experiments show that centralized communication is productive to routine decision-making but the quality of decision-making for complex tasks is better with the decentralized communication networks. This gained admiration from organizational theorists and social psychologists, mainly due to turning a complex social situation into a quantifiable and controllable experiment. The experiments led to a notion where a central actor is relatively close to other actors in its network and is in optimal position for integrating information from the dislocated network parts.

In 1950, Bavelas defined closeness as the reciprocal of the farness, that is, the sum of distance from all actors. This also led to the development of the centrality index, which was used as an indicator for how quickly information would travel through the network.

He also looked at the development of theories, where experiments showed that the complexity of theories grow until a revolution throws it all away.

== Stanford University ==
Bavelas left MIT in 1956 and worked for Bell Telephone Labs for four years. He then joined Stanford University's business school as a professor of psychology. He was a fellow for Stanford's Center for Advanced Study in the Behavioral Sciences from 1954 to 1955. He was at Stanford until 1970 and he also taught at the University of Victoria in Canada.

== Family ==
Alex Bavelas was married to Janet Beavin Bavelas.

== Death ==
Bavelas died in Sidney, British Columbia on August 16, 1993.

== Selected works ==
- (1948) “A mathematical model for group structures”, Applied Anthropology, 7: 16–30
- (1950) “Communication patterns in task-oriented groups”, Journal of Acoustical Society of America, 57: 271–82
- (1960), "Leadership: Man and Function", Administrative Science Quarterly, 4(4), 491–498
- (1965) with Hastorf, A. H., Gross, A. E., & Kite, W. R.. "Experiments on the alteration of group structure", Journal of Experimental Social Psychology, 1(1), 55–70
- "Communication Patterns in Problem-solving Groups"
