= Harwood research =

Harwood research refers to research in organizational psychology that took place at Harwood Manufacturing, a Virginia-based textiles manufacturer, over the course of four decades in the early to mid-Twentieth Century.

== History ==
Harwood Manufacturing is a family textile company which became the site for a number of experiments in the behavioral sciences and workplace innovation, beginning in the late 1930s and extending over the next four decades. Shortly after Harwood Manufacturing had moved its operations from New England to Virginia the newly opened factory started to experience difficulties with recruiting skilled workers. As a result of the moving the company had to train 300 inexperienced people from the Virginia mountains- to meet the high production standards of the industrialized areas of the North America.

Despite the fact that inexperienced trainees (who were mainly woman) were eager to work, on the job their pace was slow, their output was too low and the turnover was enormously high. After twelve weeks of training, the new employees produced only half as much as apprentices who were doing similar task in Northern US factories. Constant changes in methods and jobs, which were considered necessary in order to beat a highly intense competition, were frequently resulting in low productivity, aggressive behavior towards management, a drop in output and absenteeism. In 1939 Kurt Lewin was invited by Alfred Marrow, the managing director of the factory, to discuss significant problems of labor with the staff of the Harwood Manufacturing Corporation. The Harwood study is considered the first experiment of group decision making and self-management in industry and the first example of applied organizational psychology. The Harwood Experiment was part of Lewin's continuing exploration of participatory action research.

The Harwood studies can be divided into three time frames: the Lewin years, 1939 to 1947; the post-Lewin years, 1947 to 1962; and the Weldon years (after Harwood took over the Weldon Manufacturing Corporation), 1962 onward. By the opinion of Alfred Marrow, the owner of the factory and the later biographer of Kurt Lewin, the key experiments that were done on the factory were concerning group behavior, self-management, leadership training, changing stereotypes and overcoming resistance to change.

== Harwood experiments ==
=== Introduction ===
The very first problem Kurt Lewin was trying to solve was employee turnover. The factory saw the core problem in employees’ lack of experience, however Kurt Lewin argued that the constant pressure and the way workers were treated could be a more important reason for people quitting their jobs. Lewin came up with several possible solutions to such a problem. The main idea was to draw supervisors’ attention to the way they treat their subordinates — to exclude the pressure and instead to find a way to make them believe that all the standards and goals are achievable. Also he highlighted that it is essential to deal with workers as members of small groups rather than as individuals. These changes began to bring about improvements in terms of employee retention, but there were still many other issues the plant needed to deal with. Lewin suggested that the company should employ its own full-time psychologist and start its own program of research.

Throughout the period of 1939–1962 years several psychologists were assisting Lewin or, after his death, conducting their own experiments. The first psychologist who was employed by the factory was Alex Bavelas. When he returned to his studies, he was replaced by John R. P. French Jr. who was later joined by Lester Coch. The study began with Bavelas who was asked to plan and carry out a series of group experiments on human factors in factory management within the domain of action research in industry.

=== Group decision ===
The first experiment aimed to analyze the effect of giving workers a chance to take part in setting their own goals and control their output. Bavelas selected a group of the productive factory workers with whom he met several times a week. Those meetings were informal 30-minute gatherings where each group member was encouraged to discuss the difficulties he or she might encounter if the group wanted to increase its daily production. All together they were discussing each operator’s working method and analyzing advantages and disadvantages of such approach. In so doing, it became clear that workers often use different methods while doing the same task. They also identified changes that the company’s management would need to make to improve productivity. Management agreed to help carry through the changes that were recommended.

At the end of each meeting the group would vote on whether to increase their daily output, to what level, and over what period of time. As a result, they voted to enhance output from 75 units per hour to 87 over a period of 5 days. After reaching this figure, they then agreed to increase the rate to 90. Throughout the next five months the group managed to maintain a significant growth that was reached by the end of those meetings. No other group in the factory was capable of achieving the same results.

Lewin concluded that the democratic way of decision making process was the key solution for productivity growth. However, in order to check that, Bavelas set up meetings with two other groups of operators. In both cases, the groups only discussed increasing productivity without further voting. The result was that only a slight improvement in their productivity occurred.

=== Self-management ===
The second experiment was aimed to discover the influence of self-management on the level of productivity. To test this opinion, Baveals let workers decide themselves the level of output without strong control from the management side. He had a small group of workers plan their own hourly pace and daily work level as long as they kept at or above the obligatory minimum quota. The planning of the pace was made with the use of "pacing cards". These workers were on piece work, and therefore, the more they produced above the minimum quota the greater was their pay. Bavelas also established a control group whose work arrangements were not changed. The level of production of the control group didn’t change, whereas the output of the experimental group grew from 67 units per hour to 82 units. Lewin concluded the main cause of such a positive result was lowering the pressure from managerial side toward workers.

Although those two experiments proved the importance of employee involvement to the decision making at work, John R. P. French argued that it has to go hand in hand with the style of personal leadership. Therefore, French introduced the idea of changing the style of management personal leadership in order to modify the forces that influence work group behavior.

=== Leadership training ===
Bavelas’ series of experiments showed that the autocratic approach to management does not result in increased efficiency of workers. That is why a change in leadership style is another thing that was considered important to achieve in the Harwood Manufacturing. The idea of this training was to give the necessary knowledge to supervisors concerning cooperation, morale, disciplinary problems and trust. Relying to the Lippitt-White study of authoritarian and democratic leadership styles, Lewin came up with the idea of Leadership training for all the levels of supervisory management. The methods that were used the most were role playing, socio-drama, self-examination, feedback-sessions, group problem solving, and other action research techniques.

During the meetings participants were asked about all the problems they encounter on daily basis at work. Later on those problems were discussed, various other scenarios were enacted, and between meetings the participants would try out different approaches to the problems they faced, and the results of these would be analyzed in the following training session. Shortly after fifth meeting, participants had found a way to effectively develop their interpersonal skills. The majority of them stated that it became easier to communicate and deal with their superiors as well as with their peers. The skills in getting the cooperation of subordinates had significantly improved, as had their subordinates’ productivity.

=== Changing stereotypes ===
Like many companies at those times Harwood Manufacturing had a policy of not recruiting women after their thirties. But because of the war they were finding it harder and harder to employ young female workers. The only way to solve this problem was to start hiring older employees. However this idea was not supported by management of all levels; they strongly believed that older employees would have difficulties meeting the factory’s requirements compared to the younger females. French suggested to assess the value to the company of each worker as follows: productivity, speed of learning new jobs, sickness/absence, and turnover rate. After collecting the data it turned out that older workers were outperforming the younger ones.

French and Marrow found that providing facts to management did not influence their opinion, but when top management was involved in research, so that the facts would be top management’s own discovery, attitudes changed and with the time superior workers started to accept the idea of recruiting older employees.

=== Overcoming resistance to change ===
The experiment on overcoming resistance to change stemmed from the problem of employees’ reluctance to changes. Workers were not satisfied with the job transfers. They had to constantly leave tasks at which they had just developed proficiency. As a result, the company was encountering lower output, grievances, and increased labor turnover. The more difficult the new job, the greater was the degree of frustration. That is why Coch and French established four experimental groups. In this research they were trying to address the two main questions:

- Why do people resist change so strongly?
- What can be done to overcome this resistance?

The first group was a control group. The new changes at work were announced to them in a usual manner and they were given a chance to ask questions. The second group was given more precise information about changes and was allowed to elect representatives who would participate in planning and setting the new production rates. Members of groups 3 and 4 were entirely involved in the discussion process with management about all aspects of the change. They could make a number of recommendations and help to plan the most efficient methods for doing the new job. The result of the experiment was that the level of productivity and the amount of aggression expressed against management varied inversely with the degree of participation in the changes. Average production in the first group dropped 20 per cent and did not regain the pre-change level. The group which participated through representatives required two weeks to recover its pre-change output and, finally, groups 3 and 4 reached an increase of about 15% of the output their prechange productivity levels.

Coch and French’s examination have indicated that behavior of employees can be influenced by their direct participation and involvement.

== Implication and criticism ==
These studies became a part of the Harwood working process for more than 30 years. The results of experiments were used to bring understanding to group behavior and identify change options for companies. They helped to create many of the tools and techniques used in organization development.

In terms of criticism, there are several issues concerning the experiments which were discussed the most. Clem Adelman highlighted that Lewin did not draw attention to power relations issue between superior workers and their subordinates. In the series of experiments in Harwood Manufacturing, Lewin automatically assumed that goals of management were rational and unquestionable.

Mel Van Elteren (referring to the earlier work of Graebner) speculated on the question of whether the Lewin’s studies were exclusively democratic and did they contain the manipulative element. In each case in Harwood experiments, predetermined goals had already been set by management which cannot be interpreted as a fundamentally democratic approach.

The "overcoming resistance to change" experiment performed Coch and French has been criticized over the years, mostly in relation to the management and methodology of their research. When the psychologists started this experiment, they had been already working in the factory for several years and moreover employees were predisposed to respond well to the participative approach.

Many critics claimed that the study in Harwood was an atypical case due to the fact that the owner of the factory was a certified psychologist who had a full interest and curiosity in conducting experiments in the factory.

== See also ==
- Action Research
- Alfred J. Marrow
- Field Theory
- Hawthorne effect
- Kurt Lewin
- Organization development
- Organizational psychology
- Participatory action research
- Participatory management
