= Jean Lipman-Blumen =

American academic

Jean Lipman-Blumen is the Thornton F. Bradshaw Professor of Public Policy and Professor of Organizational Behavior at Claremont Graduate University in Claremont, California. She is an expert on leadership, achieving styles, crisis management, "hot groups" organizational behavior, gender roles, and toxic leadership. Lipman-Blumen is director and co-founder, with Prof. Richard Ellsworth, of CGU's Institute for Advanced Studies in Leadership. She is president and co-founder, with Harold J. Leavitt, the Kilpatrick Professor of Organizational Behavior, at Stanford Graduate School of Business, of the Connective Leadership Institute (formerly the Achieving Styles Institute), a leadership development, research, and management consulting firm, in Pasadena, California.

Lipman-Blumen received her A.B. (English Literature) and A.M. (Sociology) degrees from Wellesley College, and her Ph.D. (Social Relations) from Harvard University, where she did her dissertation under Talcott Parsons. She spent one post-doctoral year at Carnegie Mellon University under the supervision of Nobel Laureate Herbert A. Simon and a second post-doctoral year completing her studies in mathematics, statistics, and computer science, at Stanford University. She also spent 1978–79 as a Fellow-in-Residence at the Center for Advanced Study in the Behavioral Sciences, in Palo Alto. She received the International Leadership Association's (ILA) Lifetime Achievement Award in 2010, an award that "honors an individual's accomplishments in the development and enhancement of the field of leadership over her lifetime." She also received a Lifetime Achievement Award from the Peter F. Drucker/Masatoshi Ito Graduate School of Management, Claremont Graduate University.

Lipman-Blumen has served as assistant director of the National Institute of Education and as a special advisor to the Domestic Policy Staff in the White House under President Jimmy Carter.

She has published nine books, three monographs, and more than 200 articles on public policy, management, leadership, crisis management, gender roles, and toxic leadership. Her book, The Connective Edge: Leading in an Interdependent World (Jossey-Bass, 1996), paperback – Connective Leadership: Managing in a Changing World (Oxford University Press, 2000), was nominated for the Pulitzer Prize. Hot Groups: Seeding Them, Feeding Them, and Using Them to Ignite Your Organization (Oxford University Press), 1999), with Harold J. Leavitt, professor emeritus, Stanford Graduate School of Business, was the American Publishers' Association "Business Book of the Year." She is also the author of The Allure of Toxic Leaders: Why We Follow Destructive Bosses and Corrupt Politicians – and How We Can Survive Them (Oxford University Press, 2004) and a co-editor, with Ronald Riggio and Ira Chaleff, of The Art of Followership (Jossey-Bass, 2008). Lipman-Blumen consults to numerous public and private sector organizations in the U.S. and abroad. She is the co-founding director, with Harold J. Leavitt, of the Connective Leadership Institute (formerly the "Achieving Styles Institute"), Pasadena, CA. She has also served on several editorial and other not-for-profit boards, including the International Leadership Association, emerita and the De Pree Leadership Center, and the Ernest Becker Foundation.
