= Paul Watzlawick =

Austrian-American psychologist and philosopher (1921–2007)

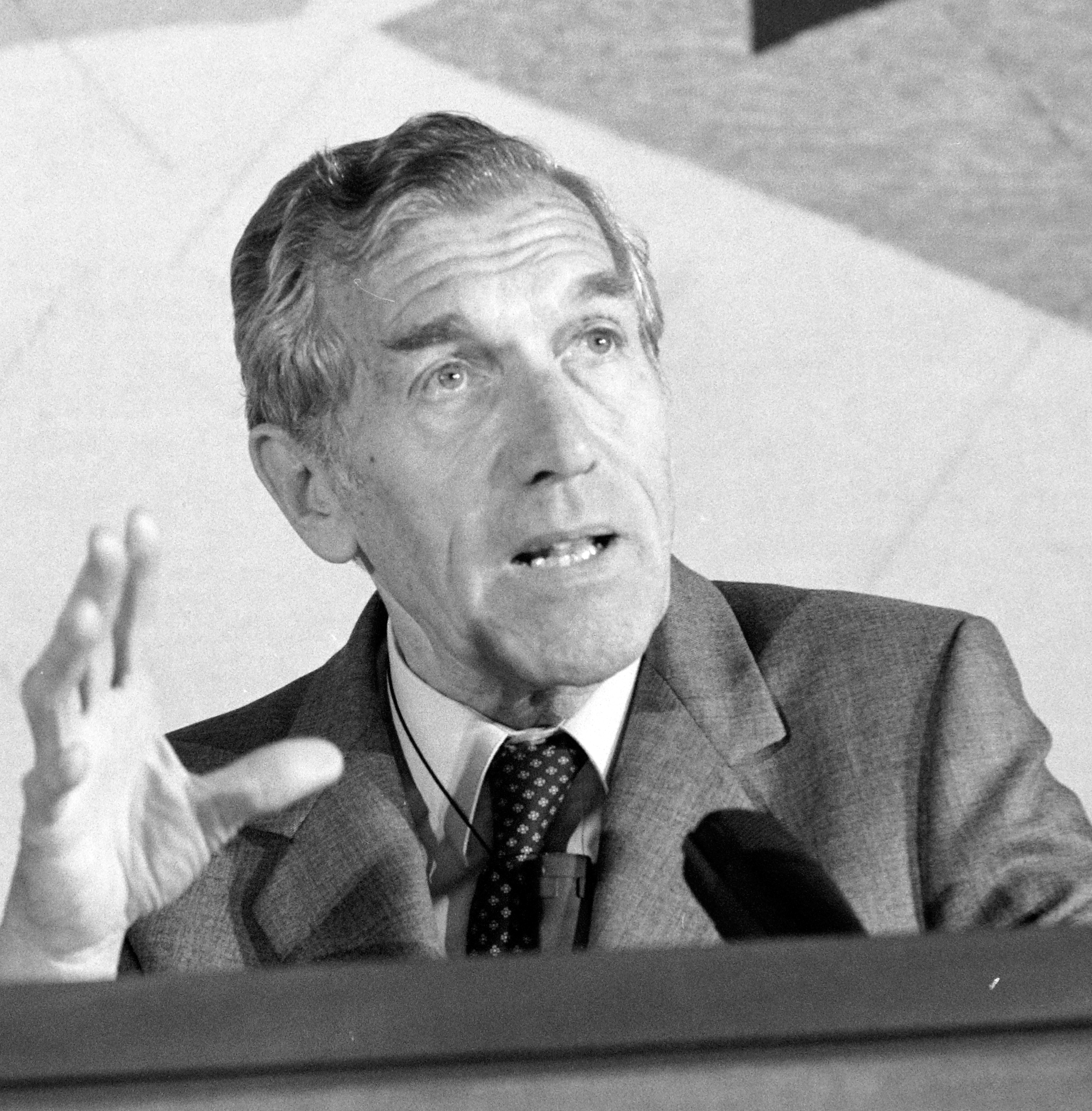
- Born: July 25, 1921; Villach, Austria
- Died: March 31, 2007 (aged 85); Palo Alto, California, U.S.

Philosophical work
- Main interests: Communication theory and radical constructivism
- Notable ideas: "One cannot not communicate"

Paul Watzlawick (July 25, 1921 – March 31, 2007) was an Austrian-American family therapist, psychologist, communication theorist, and philosopher. A theoretician in communication theory and radical constructivism, he commented in the fields of family therapy and general psychotherapy. Watzlawick believed that people create their own suffering in the very act of trying to fix their emotional problems. He was one of the most influential figures at the Mental Research Institute and lived and worked in Palo Alto, California.

== Early life and education ==
Paul Watzlawick was born in Villach, Austria in 1921, the son of a bank director. After he graduated from high school in 1939, Watzlawick studied philosophy and philology at the Università Ca' Foscari Venice and he earned a PhD in 1949. He then studied at the Carl Jung Institute in Zürich, where he received a degree in analytical psychology in 1954. In 1957 he continued his research career at the University of El Salvador.

== Career ==
In 1960, Donald deAvila Jackson arranged for him to go to Palo Alto to do research at the Mental Research Institute (MRI). Starting in 1967 he taught psychiatry at Stanford University.

At the Mental Research Institute Watzlawick followed in the footsteps of Gregory Bateson and the research team (Jackson, John Weakland, Jay Haley) responsible for introducing what became known as the "double bind" theory of schizophrenia. Double bind can be defined as a person trapped under mutually-exclusive expectations. Watzlawick's 1967 work based on Bateson's thinking, Pragmatics of Human Communication, with Don Jackson and Janet Beavin, became a cornerstone work of communication theory. Other scientific contributions include works on radical constructivism and most importantly his theory on communication. He was active in the field of family therapy.

Watzlawick was one of the three founding members of the Brief Therapy Center at MRI. In 1974, members of the Center published a major work on their brief approach, Change, Principles of Problem Formation and Problem Resolution (Watzlawick, Weakland, Fisch).

He was licensed as a psychologist in California from 1969 to 1998, when he stopped seeing patients.

== Personal life ==
Watzlawick was married (Vera) and had two stepdaughters (Joanne and Evonne). A cardiac arrest at his home in Palo Alto caused his death at the age of 85.

== Work ==
=== Interactional view ===
Watzlawick did extensive research on how communication is effected within families. Watzlawick defines five basic axioms in his theory on communication, popularly known as the "Interactional View". The Interactional View is an interpretive theory drawing from the cybernetic tradition. Watzlawick considered five axioms as a prerequisite for functioning communication process and competence between two individuals or an entire family. According to him, miscommunication happens because not all of the communicators are "speaking the same language". This happens because people have different viewpoints of speaking. With an underlying cybernetic structure, Watzlawick considered causality of a circular, feedback nature, with information as a core element. it is concerned with the processes of communication within systems of the widest sense and therefore also with human systems, e.g., families, large organizations and international relations.

Within the "Interactional View" communication is based on what is happening, and not necessarily associated with who, when, where, or why it takes place. He studied "Normal" as well as the "disturbed" family in order to infer conditions conducive to the approach of interaction-orientation. He believed that individual personality, character, and deviance are shaped by the individual's relations with his fellows. He saw symptoms, defenses, character structure and personality as terms describing the individual's typical interactions, which occur in response to a particular interpersonal context.

=== Five basic axioms ===
The Interactional View requires a network of communication rules that govern a family homeostasis, which is the tacit collusion of family members to maintain the status quo. Even if the status quo is negative it can still be hard to change. Interactional theorists believe that a person will fail to recognize this destructive resistance to change unless he or she understand Watzlawick's axioms. The following axioms can explain how miscommunication can occur if not all the communicators are on the same page. If one of these axioms is somehow disturbed, communication might fail. All of these axioms are derived from the work of Gregory Bateson, much of which is collected in Steps to an Ecology of Mind (1972).

Watzlawick, Beavin Bavelas and Jackson support these axioms to maintain family homeostasis.

- One cannot not communicate: Every behavior is a form of communication. Because behavior does not have a counterpart (there is no anti-behavior), it is impossible not to communicate. Even if communication is being avoided (such as the unconscious use of non-verbals or symptom strategy), that is a form of communication. "Symptom strategy" is ascribing our silence to something beyond our control and makes no communication impossible. Examples of symptom strategy are sleepiness, headaches, and drunkenness. Even facial expressions, digital communication, and being silent can be analyzed as communication by a receiver.
- Every communication has a content and relationship aspect such that the latter classifies the former and is therefore a metacommunication: All communication includes, apart from the plain meaning of words, more information. This information is based on how the speaker wants to be understood and how he himself sees his relation to the receiver of information. Relationship is the command part of the message or how it is non-verbally said. Content is the report or what is said verbally. Being able to interpret both of these aspects is essential in understanding something that a communicator said. The relational aspect of interaction is known as metacommunication. Metacommunication is communication about communication. Relationship messages are always the most important element in communication.
- The nature of a relationship is dependent on the punctuation of the partners' communication procedures (punctuation as translated from "Interpunktion" in German) : Both the sender and the receiver of information structure the communication flow differently and therefore interpret their own behavior during communicating as merely a reaction on the other's behavior (i.e., every partner thinks the other one is the cause of a specific behavior). To "punctuate" a communication means to interpret an ongoing sequence of events by labeling one event as the cause or beginning, and the following event as the response. In a situation with communication, if one thing happens, something else always happens. For example, a female in a relationship with a male is feeling depressed. The male in the relationship with the female feels guilty. One who observes this situation might ask, "Is she depressed because of his guilt, or does he feel guilty because of her depression?"
- Human communication involves both digital and analog modalities: This axiom refers back to the use of non-verbals and system strategy explained in the first axiom. It is mostly related to the digital content of communication within a relationship.
- Inter-human communication procedures are either symmetric or complementary: This axiom focuses on metacommunication with two main components called symmetrical interchange and complementary interchange. Symmetrical interchange is an interaction based on equal power between communicators. In accordance to that, complementary interchange is an interaction based on differences in power. Within these two interchanges there are three different ways they can be used: one-up, one-down, and one-across. With a one-up communication, one communicator attempts to gain control of an exchange by dominating the overall communication. A one-down communication has the opposite effect. A communicator attempts to yield control of an interaction or submit to someone. The final message is a one-across communication. This communication moves to neutralize a situation. This is also called transitory if only one communicator is attempting this style. When two communicators use the same style of one-up, one-down, or one-across, it is symmetrical. If they are opposing one another it is complementary. This axiom allows us to understand how an interaction can be perceived by the styles a communicator is using.

=== Additional notions ===
Some interrelated notions that make up the Interactional View promoted by Watzlawick and colleagues at the MRI include:

- One cannot not communicate, and the related idea that one cannot not influence;
- Understanding behavior as if we are constantly exchanging messages defining the nature of relationships of which we are a part;
- Shifting focus of attention from intent to the effects of behavior as communication;
- Observer-imposed punctuation;
- Emphasizing the vital role of the therapist's preconceptions in bringing forth socially constructed reality;
- Investing the ramifications of self-fulfilling prophecy; and
- Articulating and fully embracing the "as If" nature of behavior.

A term that is used often in the theory of the Interactional View is enabler. An enabler is within addiction culture; a person whose non-assertive behavior allows others to continue in their substance abuse. An example of this would be a person letting their sibling continue to act in an immature manner because that is what the family is used to him doing.

Another word frequently used in the Interactional View is double-bind. Someone in a double-bind, is a person trapped by expectations; the powerful party requests that the low-power party act symmetrically. An example of this would be a person asking another person, "Why didn't you like the movie?" or "You like rock 'n' roll, don't you?" The first person is asking the second person to act in a way that is similar (symmetrical) to them.

== Legacy ==
Paul Watzlawick theory had great impact on the creation of the four-sides model by Friedemann Schulz von Thun.

Michel Weber argues for a cross-elucidation and reinforcement between the worldviews of Alfred North Whitehead and Watzlawick in his paper "The Art of Epochal Change".

== Publications ==
Watzlawick wrote 22 books that were translated into 80 languages for academic and general audiences with more than 150 scientific articles and book chapters. Books he has written or on which he has collaborated include:

- An Anthology of Human Communication, 1964
- Watzlawick, P., Beavin-Bavelas, J., Jackson, D. 1967. Some Tentative Axioms of Communication. In Pragmatics of Human Communication - A Study of Interactional Patterns, Pathologies and Paradoxes. W. W. Norton, New York, 1967, OCLC 168614
- Change: Principles of Problem Formation and Problem Resolution (with John Weakland and Richard Fisch), 1974, OCLC 730810, W W Norton page
- How Real Is Real?, 1976, OCLC 1818442
- The Language of Change, 1977, OCLC 3609867, W W Norton page
- Gebrauchsanweisung für Amerika, 1978
- The Situation Is Hopeless, But Not Serious: The Pursuit of Unhappiness, 1983, OCLC 9464987, W W Norton page
- The Invented Reality: How Do We Know What We Believe We Know? (Contributions to Constructivism), 1984, OCLC 9412760
- Ultra-Solutions, or, How to Fail Most Successfully, 1988, OCLC 16682320
- The Interactional View: studies at the Mental Research Institute, Palo Alto, 1965–1974, 1977
- Munchausen's Pigtail and other Essays, 1990
