= Janet Beavin Bavelas =

Experimental social psychologist

- Born: Janet Clare Helmick; February 12, 1940; Portland, Oregon, U.S.
- Died: December 12, 2022 (aged 82); Victoria, British Columbia, Canada
- Occupation: Social psychologist
- Spouse: Alex Bavelas

Janet Clare Beavin Bavelas (née Helmick; February 12, 1940 – December 12, 2022) was an experimental social psychologist who studied gesture, contributing to our understanding of face-to-face interaction. An American, educated in the U.S., her entire career was spent in Canada.

== Education and career ==
Janet Clare Helmick was born February 12, 1940, in Portland, Oregon. She earned a B.A. in Psychology, an M.A. in Communication, and a Ph.D. in Psychology, all from Stanford University. She worked as a research assistant, then research associate, at the Mental Research Institute from 1961 to 1970, during her M.A. and Ph.D. studies.

She accepted a position in psychology at the University of Victoria in Canada in 1970, where she rose from Assistant Professor to Associate Dean of Graduate Studies, and later Associate Dean of Research. She formally retired as Professor Emeritus in 2005, but never stopped conducting research, often through the research group she helped found, International Microanalysis Associates.

She received considerable recognition as a scholar: she received dozens of major research grants, many from the Canada Council or the Social Sciences and Humanities Research Council of Canada, and awards (including Outstanding Scholar of the Language and Social Interaction Division of the International Communication Association; Award for Teaching Excellence from the University of Victoria); she was an elected fellow of multiple organizations (Canadian Psychological Association, International Communication Association, Royal Society of Canada); and served as President of the International Society for Gesture Studies from 2005–07.

In 2012, she was named one of the "founding parents" of communication. She was described as "a gifted researcher" who "inspired many colleagues and students."

In a newspaper profile in 1996, she debunked popular ideas about body language, describing most common assumptions as unsupported by research.

== Research ==
Bavelas co-authored Pragmatics of human communication with Paul Watzlawick and Don Jackson in 1967, a book which established her reputation while still a graduate student, and which has been called "revolutionary". Demonstrating that evaluation, over 50 years later, it is still available in hard copy, as an e-book, and in 8 translations. What was unique, especially for the time, and especially for psychologists, was the focus on the interactions between people rather than individual mental processes.

In 2022, she wrote the summary of her life’s work, Face-to-face dialogue: Theory, research, and applications. Her long-range goal was "to find or create experimental methods that could inform and expand the study of interpersonal communication". Unlike many who study interaction within communication, she assumed it appropriate to study gestures experimentally, and did not see the quantitative/qualitative divide as problematic, as so many other interactional scholars did and do. Key to studying gesture is video recording, which she considered as important to the study of nonverbal communication as the microscope is to biology, a reference to an early comment by Margaret Mead who first pointed out the parallel between the opportunities provided by the technology of video cameras with that of earlier microscopes.

Within gesture studies, Bavelas and her team first emphasized motor mimicry, described as "when an observer responds in a way that would be appropriate to the situation of the person he or she is observing". Later, she and team members examined interactive gestures (hand gestures used in conversation) as well as a wide variety of related topics, such as facial displays. The method used was eventually formalized as microanalysis of face-to-face dialogue (MFD), defined as "the systematic, moment-by-moment examination of specific observable behaviors in face-to-face dialogue, focusing on their immediate communicative functions".

== Family ==
Janet Beavin Bavelas was married to Alex Bavelas until his death in 1993.

== Selected publications ==
- Bavelas, J. B. (2021). Pragmatics of Human Communication 50 Years Later. Journal of Systemic Therapies, 40(2), 3–25.
- Bavelas, J. B. (2022). Face-to-face dialogue: Theory, research, and applications. Oxford University Press.
- Bavelas, J. B., Black, A., Lemery, C. R., & Mullett, J. (1986). "I show how you feel." Motor mimicry as a communicative act. Journal of Personality and Social Psychology, 50, 322–329.
- Bavelas, J. B., Chovil, N., Lawrie, D. A., & Wade, A. (1992). Interactive gestures. Discourse Processes, 15, 469–489.
- Bavelas, J. B., Gerwing, J., & Healing, S. (2014). Including facial gestures in gesture-speech ensembles. In M. Seyfeddinipur & M. Gullberg (Eds.), From gesture in conversation to visible action as utterance: Essays in honor of Adam Kendon (pp. 15–34). Amsterdam: John Benjamins.
- Bavelas, J. B., Gerwing, J., Healing, S., & Tomori, C. (2016). Microanalysis of Face-to-face Dialogue: An Inductive Approach. In C. A. VanLear & D. J. Canary (Eds.), Researching communication interaction behavior: A sourcebook of methods and measures (pp. 129–157). Thousand Oaks, CA: Sage.
- Watzlawick, P., Beavin, J., & Jackson, D. D. (1967). Pragmatics of Human Communication: A study of interactional patterns, pathologies, and paradoxes. New York: Norton.

== See also ==
- Adam Kendon
- Gesture
- Kinesics
- Mental Research Institute
- Nonverbal communication
- Paul Watzlawick
- Ray Birdwhistell
