= Dorwin Cartwright =

Social psychologist (1915–2008)

Dorwin P. Cartwright
- Born: March 3, 1915; Des Moines, Iowa
- Died: July 18, 2008 (aged 93); Santa Barbara, California
- Education: Swarthmore College; Harvard University
- Scientific career
- Fields: Social psychology
- Workplaces: University of Michigan
- Thesis: Decision-time in Relation to the Differentiation of the Phenomenal Field (1940)
- Doctoral advisors: Kurt Lewin; Edwin Boring
- Doctoral students: Alex Bavelas; Harold Kelley; John Thibaut; Robert Zajonc

Dorwin Philip Cartwright (March 3, 1915 – July 18, 2008) was an American social psychologist, and considered one of the founders of the field of group dynamics. Cartwright's research and writing topics included the mathematical foundations of group dynamics, the sources of social power, the nature of group structure and the causes of risk taking in groups. He was a professor of psychology at the University of Michigan for 31 years.
