= How Real Is Real? =

1976 book by Paul Watzlawick

- Author: Paul Watzlawick
- Language: German
- Publisher: Piper Verlag
- Publication date: 1976
- Publication place: Germany
- English publication date: 5 March 1976
- Pages: 252
- ISBN: 3492021824

How Real Is Real? Confusion, Disinformation, Communication (German: Wie wirklich ist die Wirklichkeit? Wahn, Täuschung, Verstehen) is a 1976 book by the Austrian-American writer Paul Watzlawick. It is about communication and its relationship with reality.

Kirkus Reviews called the book entertaining and intriguing, writing that "Watzlawick is a superb popularizer who couches his scientific data in anecdotes, paradoxes, games, conundrums, jokes and stories".
