= Alfred J. Marrow =

American industrial psychologist and author (1905–1978)

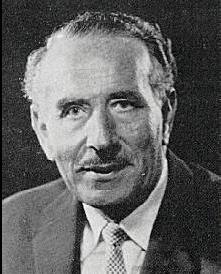
- Born: Alfred Josephon Marrow; March 8, 1905; New York City, U.S.
- Died: March 3, 1978 (aged 72); New York City, U.S.
- Education: New York University; Columbia University
- Known for: Industrial Relations; Group Dynamics; T-groups
- Spouse: Monette Courod
- Children: 2
- Relatives: David E. Green (cousin); Tammy Baldwin (first cousin twice removed); Andy Samberg (adoptive grandson)
- Awards: Kurt Lewin Memorial Award (1964)
- Scientific career
- Fields: Industrial psychology

Alfred Josephon Marrow (March 8, 1905 – March 3, 1978) was an American industrial psychologist, executive, civil rights leader, and philanthropist.

== Early life and family ==
Marrow was born in New York City, the second oldest of six children of Lithuanian-Jewish parents Rebecca (née Green) and Dr. Isidore L. Marrow. His siblings were Ruth Kagan, Alfred, Sylvia Cares, Lucille Richman, Blanche Jungreis, and Seymour. His father and mother later purchased land in Long Beach, New York, building a mansion on the northwest corner of Beech Street and Magnolia Boulevard, the site of many family gatherings.

His cousin was biochemist David E. Green. Through him, Marrow was a first cousin, twice removed, of U.S. Senator Tammy Suzanne Green Baldwin.

Isidor was a director of the Israel Zion Hospital and a member of the Jewish Education Committee.

Alfred Marrow received his master's degree at Columbia University. He earned his doctorate from New York University in 1937.

== Career ==
Marrow followed his father in many undertakings, working in the family business, earning his doctorate, and involving himself in philanthropic and educational work.

Marrow was an industrial psychologist.

Among his numerous books, he wrote a biography of friend and fellow psychologist Kurt Lewin.

== Personal life ==
While earning his master's degree in New York City, he married his wife, Russian-born Monette "Monte" Marrow (née Courod). They had a son, Paul Bennett, and an adopted daughter, Marjorie. He had five grandchildren, including Andy Samberg.

He was a member of Old Oaks Country Club in Purchase, New York, and Whippoorwill Country Club in Armonk, New York.

Late in life, Marrow split his time between Manhattan and residences in the Palm Beach Towers (Palm Beach, Florida). He died of complications from leukemia in New York Hospital, five days before his 73rd birthday.

== Offices and titles ==
- President and chairman of the board of the Harwood Manufacturing Company (1940–1976), succeeding his father (ca. 1899–1940).
- Chairman of the Mayor's Commission on Intergroup Relations (New York City)
- Executive chair of the American Jewish Congress
- President of the National Academy of Professional Psychologists
- Director of the New School for Social Research
- Director of Antioch College
- Director of Gonzaga University
- Fellow of the New York Academy of Science

Consultantships and board memberships

- The American Foundation for Management Research
- The Marshall Fund
- The Presidents Association of the American Management Association

== Author ==
- Goal Tensions and Recall (1938)
- Living Without Hate: Scientific Approaches to Human Relations (1951)
- Making Management Human (1957)
- Changing Patterns of Prejudice: A New Look at Today's Racial, Religious, and Cultural Tensions (1962)
- Likrat Nihul Enoshi (Hebrew version of Making Management Human, 1963)
- Behind the Executive Mask: Greater Managerial Competence Through Deeper Self-Understanding (AMA Management Reports - 1964)
- Management by Participation: Creating a Climate for Personal and Organizational Development (Jan 1967)
- The Practical Theorist: The Life and Work of Kurt Lewin (1969)
- The Failure of Success (1972)
- Making Waves in Foggy Bottom: How a New and More Scientific Approach Changed the Management System at the State Department (1974)
- The T-group Experience: An Encounter Among People for Greater Self-Fulfillment (1975)

== Editor ==
- Kallen, Horace M. What I Believe and Why - Maybe: Essays for the Modern World (1971)

== Awards ==
- Mayoral Citation for activities on behalf of equal opportunities in housing (Mayor Robert F. Wagner, Jr., New York City, 1958)
- The Kurt Lewin Memorial Award for outstanding contributions in social psychology (1964)

== Philanthropy ==
- Alfred J. and Monette C. Marrow Professor of Psychology at the New School for Social Research
- The Alfred J. Marrow New Directions in Leadership Series, hosted by the Center for Creative Leadership
- The Portico of Octavia (etching of the Porticus Octaviae in Rome, Italy by Giovanni Battista Piranesi) at the Metropolitan Museum of Art (New York)
