= Harold Leavitt =

American psychologist

Harold Jack Leavitt (14 January 1922 – 8 December 2007) was an American psychologist of management.

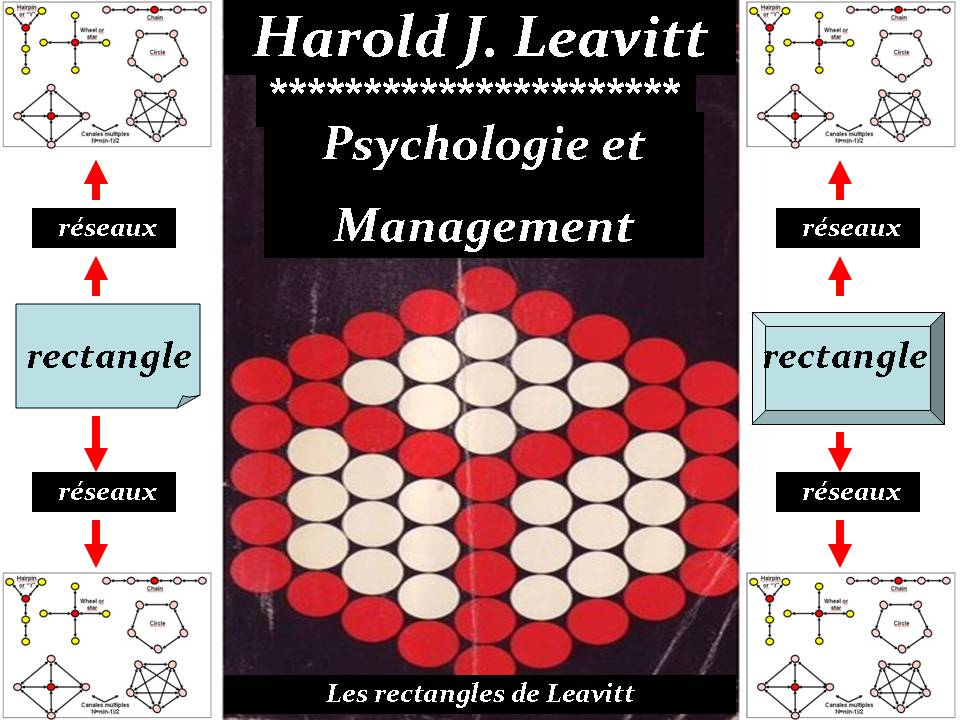

== Life and career ==
Leavitt was born on 14 January 1922. A native of Lynn, Massachusetts, he was the youngest of eleven siblings. Following the conclusion of his baccalaureate studies at Harvard University in 1943, Leavitt continued graduate study at Brown University in 1944. He then served as a United States Navy reservist for two years, and earned a doctorate from the Massachusetts Institute of Technology in 1949. Leavitt taught at the University of Chicago and Rensselaer Polytechnic Institute prior to joining the Carnegie Mellon University in 1958. He was a professor at Stanford University between 1966 and 1987, where he was later named Walter Kenneth Kilpatrick Professor of Organizational Behavior. Leavitt's tenure as principal of the Management Analysis Center began in 1971. Additionally, he was an adviser to the National Training Laboratories. In retirement, Leavitt relocated to Pasadena, California, and died of pulmonary fibrosis in the city's Huntington Memorial Hospital on 8 December 2007, aged 85.

== Research ==
Leavitt dealt with the analysis of patterns of interaction and communication in groups, and also interferences in communication. He examined the personality characteristics of leaders. He distinguished three types of managers:

1. The visionary and charismatic leader is characterized by being original, witty, and uncompromising. He is often eccentric and seeks to break with status quo, and embarking on a new path. Historical examples of such leaders were Gandhi, Hitler, Gladstone and the Ayatollah Khomeini.
2. The rational and analyzing leader' are holding to the facts supported by numbers. He is systematic and can effectively control. Examples of this type are Clement Attlee, Robert Peel, or Jimmy Carter.
3. The pragmatist – The contractor of established plans, skillfully solving problems. Leaders of this type are typically not visionary. They seek to subjugate the people to their will. Historical examples: Bismarck, Lenin, Stalin, Lyndon B. Johnson.

== Works ==
- Managerial Psychology. Éditions University of Cahicago Press, Chicago-London, 1975,
- Corporate Pathfinders. Homewood, Ill. Dow Jones-Irwin in 1986
- Harold J. Leavitt and Jean Lipman-Blumen: Hot Groups : Seeding Them, Feeding Them, and Using Them to Ignite Your Organization. Oxford University Press 1999, ISBN 0-19-512686-6
- Top Down, Why Hierarchies are Here to Stay and How to Manage Them More Effectively Harold J. Leavitt, Harvard Business School Press, 2004

== Sources ==
- Richard Koch: The dictionary management and finance. Tools, time, techniques from A to Z, Publisher Professional School of Business, Kraków 1997.
