= Climate as complex networks =

Conceptual model to generate insight into climate science

The field of complex networks has emerged as an area of science to generate insights into nature of complex systems The application of network theory to climate science is a young and emerging field. To identify and analyze patterns in global climate, scientists model climate data as complex networks.

Unlike most real-world networks where nodes and edges are well defined, in climate networks, nodes are identified as the sites in a spatial grid of the underlying global climate data set, which can be represented at various resolutions. Two nodes are connected by an edge depending on the degree of statistical similarity (that may be related to dependence) between the corresponding pairs of time-series taken from climate records. The climate network approach enables novel insights into the dynamics of the climate system over different spatial and temporal scales.

== Construction of climate networks ==
Depending upon the choice of nodes and/or edges, climate networks may take many different forms, shapes, sizes and complexities. Tsonis et al. introduced the field of complex networks to climate. In their model, the nodes for the network were constituted by a single variable (500 hPa) from NCEP/NCAR Reanalysis datasets. In order to estimate the edges between nodes, correlation coefficient at zero time lag between all possible pairs of nodes were estimated. A pair of nodes was considered to be connected, if their correlation coefficient is above a threshold of 0.5.

Steinhaeuser and team introduced the novel technique of multivariate networks in climate by constructing networks from several climate variables separately and capturing their interaction in multivariate predictive model. It was demonstrated in their studies that in context of climate, extracting predictors based on cluster attributes yield informative precursors to improve predictive skills.

Kawale et al. presented a graph based approach to find dipoles in pressure data. Given the importance of teleconnection, this methodology has potential to provide significant insights.

Imme et al. introduced a new type of network construction in climate based on temporal probabilistic graphical model, which provides an alternative viewpoint by focusing on information flow within network over time.

Agarwal et al. proposed advanced linear and nonlinear methods to construct and investigate climate networks at different timescales. Climate networks constructed using SST datasets at different timescale averred that multi-scale analysis of climatic processes holds the promise of better understanding the system dynamics that may be missed when processes are analyzed at one timescale only

== Applications of climate networks ==
Climate networks enable insights into the dynamics of climate system over many spatial scales. The local degree centrality and related measures have been used to identify super-nodes and to associate them to known dynamical interrelations in the atmosphere, called teleconnection patterns. It was observed that climate networks possess "small world" properties owing to the long-range spatial connections.

Steinhaeuser et al. applied complex networks to explore the multivariate and multi-scale dependence in climate data. Findings of the group suggested a close similarity of observed dependence patterns in multiple variables over multiple time and spatial scales.

Tsonis and Roeber investigated the coupling architecture of the climate network. It was found that the overall network emerges from intertwined subnetworks. One subnetwork is operating at higher altitudes and other is operating in the tropics, while the equatorial subnetwork acts as an agent linking the 2 hemispheres . Though, both networks possess Small World Property, the 2 subnetworks are significantly different from each other in terms of network properties like degree distribution.

Donges et al. applied climate networks for physics and nonlinear dynamical interpretations in climate. The team used measure of node centrality, betweenness centrality (BC) to demonstrate the wave-like structures in the BC fields of climate networks constructed from monthly averaged reanalysis and atmosphere-ocean coupled general circulation model (AOGCM) surface air temperature (SAT) data.

== Teleconnection path ==
Teleconnections are spatial patterns in the atmosphere that link weather and climate anomalies over large distances across the globe. Teleconnections have the characteristics that they are persistent, lasting for 1 to 2 weeks, and often much longer, and they are recurrent, as similar patterns tend to occur repeatedly. The presence of teleconnections is associated with changes in temperature, wind, precipitation, atmospheric variables of greatest societal interest.

== Computational issues and challenges ==
There are numerous computational challenges that arise at various stages of the network construction and analysis process in field of climate networks:

1. Calculating the pair-wise correlations between all grid points is a non-trivial task.
2. Computational demands of network construction, which depends upon the resolution of spatial grid.
3. Generation of predictive models from the data poses additional challenges.
4. Inclusion of lag and lead effects over space and time is a non-trivial task.

== See also ==
- Community structure
- Machine learning
- Network theory
- Network science
- Teleconnection
- Climatology
