= Netchain analysis =

Netchain analysis is a theoretical concept integrating supply chain management and network analysis which was introduced by Lazzarini, Chaddad and Cook in 2001. While supply chain analysis focuses on vertical and network analysis on horizontal interdependencies across companies, netchain analysis incorporates both type of interdependencies into one concept. Netchain analysis emphasizes value creation and coordination mechanism sources corresponding to different kind of interdependencies. In practice, netchain analysis is often used in a more general way referring to the perspective that takes into account chain and network characteristics as well. However, it differs in the focus and in the tools used from network science.

== Netchains ==
Netchain is a set of networks consisting of horizontal ties between firms within a particular industry or group, which are sequentially arranged based on vertical ties between firms in different layers. In practice, the phrase netchain is often used in a more general way referring to a system which has chain and network characteristics as well. From that point of view, the perspective is even more important than the object itself.

In the more practical perspective netchain is used instead of "chain and network". The simplest situation is for companies to form a supply chain or network in which they are selling product to each other. The phrase netchain captures two main aspects of collaborations. Chain reflects the hard aspect, where products and money is flowing (chain) and network reflects the soft aspect, the network of people having informal relationships. The usual representation of netchains shows the horizontal and the vertical interdependencies across companies as well. Specific networks with mainly horizontal interdependencies are sequentially arranged based on their vertical ties between firms in other networks.

== Interdependencies in netchains ==
Three kind of organizational interdependencies can be distinguished to examine the relationships of companies. Pooled interdependence is a mutual, weak and indirect connection of several entities. Sequential interdependence occurs, when the output of one unit is necessary for the next other unit to operate. Reciprocal interdependence combines pooled the previous two resulting in strong, direct relationships. Netchain analysis builds on the phrases above and focuses mainly on all type of interdependencies.

== Examples ==
=== Buyer-supplier relationships ===
Probably the simplest netchain is the one examining buyer-supplier relationships. Traditional supply chain management focuses on sequential interdependencies between a specific buyer and supplier, however the relationships among suppliers can be important as well. Usually, suppliers and buyers are connected via sequential dependencies, whereas suppliers depend on each other reciprocally. Supplier associations and knowledge exchange groups provide good examples for reciprocal interdependencies among suppliers.

=== Interorganizational food chain ===
Storer, Holmen and Pedersen describes a netchain built around a food processor. The food processor uses the output of a meat and a vegetable processor and sells food to restaurants. The meat and vegetable processors are using the output of primary producers, whereas the restaurants serve consumers and are connected to the vegetable processor and the meat processor as well. Moreover, primary producers also share information with the food processor. The main purpose of the entire food chain/network is to serve consumer needs and they need to cooperate to achieve this. As a result, a strongly connected system is formed, which can be described as a netchain.

== Further developments ==
The strictly defined netchain analysis could not become popular in the field of supply chain management. After its introduction the netchain concept was widely used in the agribusiness sector. Nevertheless, the perspective of network science and network analysis is used more and more generally to examine supply chains/networks. First of all, as information technology develops communication becomes easier. Second, more and more companies start to realize the importance of collaboration with firms operating in the same environment. This change provides an opportunity for supply chain analysis to integrate the knowledge and tools of network science.

=== Customer horizons ===
Customer horizon indicates the market orientation of a company in the case of netchains. In a chain and network environment it reflects the ability of companies to identify downstream customers and what they need. The phrase and two measurements of customer horizons, breadth and length, were introduced by Storer, Holman and Pedersen in 2010. The importance of market orientation becomes more complicated in a netchain environment, because it is harder to identify the customers of a specific unit. Therefore, it is even more important for companies to allocate resources for this purpose in netchains.

=== Social netchains in the agribusiness environment ===
The concept of social netchains focuses on interpersonal relationships rather connections among companies. Talamini and Ferreira designed it mainly to the agribusiness sector, where personal relationships are more important.
