= Climatology =

Scientific study of climate

Köppen-Geiger climate classification (1980–2016)

Climatology (from Greek κλίμα, klima, "slope"; and -λογία, -logia) or climate science is the scientific study of Earth's climate; an assumed background probability distribution for weather outcomes in the real-world. Often this is defined as the distribution of weather conditions over a period of at least 30 years. Climate concerns the expected distribution of atmospheric condition, over a long period of time assuming stationarity, whilst weather is the experienced outcome over a short period of time. The main topics of research are the study of climate variability, mechanisms of climate changes and modern climate change. This topic of study is regarded as part of the atmospheric sciences and a subdivision of physical geography, which is one of the Earth sciences. Climatology includes some aspects of oceanography and biogeochemistry.

The main methods employed by climatologists are the analysis of observations and modelling of the physical processes that determine climate. Short term weather forecasting can be interpreted in terms of knowledge of longer-term phenomena of climate, for instance climatic cycles such as the El Niño–Southern Oscillation (ENSO), the Madden–Julian oscillation (MJO), the North Atlantic oscillation (NAO), the Arctic oscillation (AO), the Pacific decadal oscillation (PDO), and the Interdecadal Pacific Oscillation (IPO). Climate models are used for a variety of purposes from studying the dynamics of the weather and climate system to predictions of future climate.

== History ==
The Greeks began the formal study of climate; in fact, the word "climate" is derived from the Greek word klima, meaning "slope", referring to the slope or inclination of the Earth's axis. Arguably the most influential classic text concerning climate was On Airs, Water and Places written by Hippocrates about 400 BCE. This work commented on the effect of climate on human health and cultural differences between Asia and Europe. This idea that climate controls which populations excel depending on their climate, or climatic determinism, remained influential throughout history. Chinese scientist Shen Kuo (1031–1095) inferred that climates naturally shifted over an enormous span of time, after observing petrified bamboos found underground near Yanzhou (modern Yan'an, Shaanxi province), a dry-climate area unsuitable at that time for the growth of bamboo.

The invention of thermometers and barometers during the Scientific Revolution allowed for systematic recordkeeping, that began as early as 1640–1642 in England. Early climate researchers include Edmund Halley, who published a map of the trade winds in 1686 after a voyage to the southern hemisphere. Benjamin Franklin (1706–1790) first mapped the course of the Gulf Stream for use in sending mail from North America to Europe. Francis Galton (1822–1911) invented the term anticyclone. Helmut Landsberg (1906–1985) fostered the use of statistical analysis in climatology.

During the early 20th century, climatology mostly emphasized the description of regional climates. This descriptive climatology was mainly an applied science, giving farmers and other interested people statistics about what the normal weather was and how great chances were of extreme events. To do this, climatologists had to define a climate normal, or an average of weather and weather extremes over a period of typically 30 years. While scientists knew of past climate change such as the ice ages, the concept of climate as changing only very gradually was useful for descriptive climatology. This started to change during the decades that followed, and while the history of climate change science started earlier, climate change only became one of the main topics of study for climatologists during the 1970s and afterward.

== Subfields ==
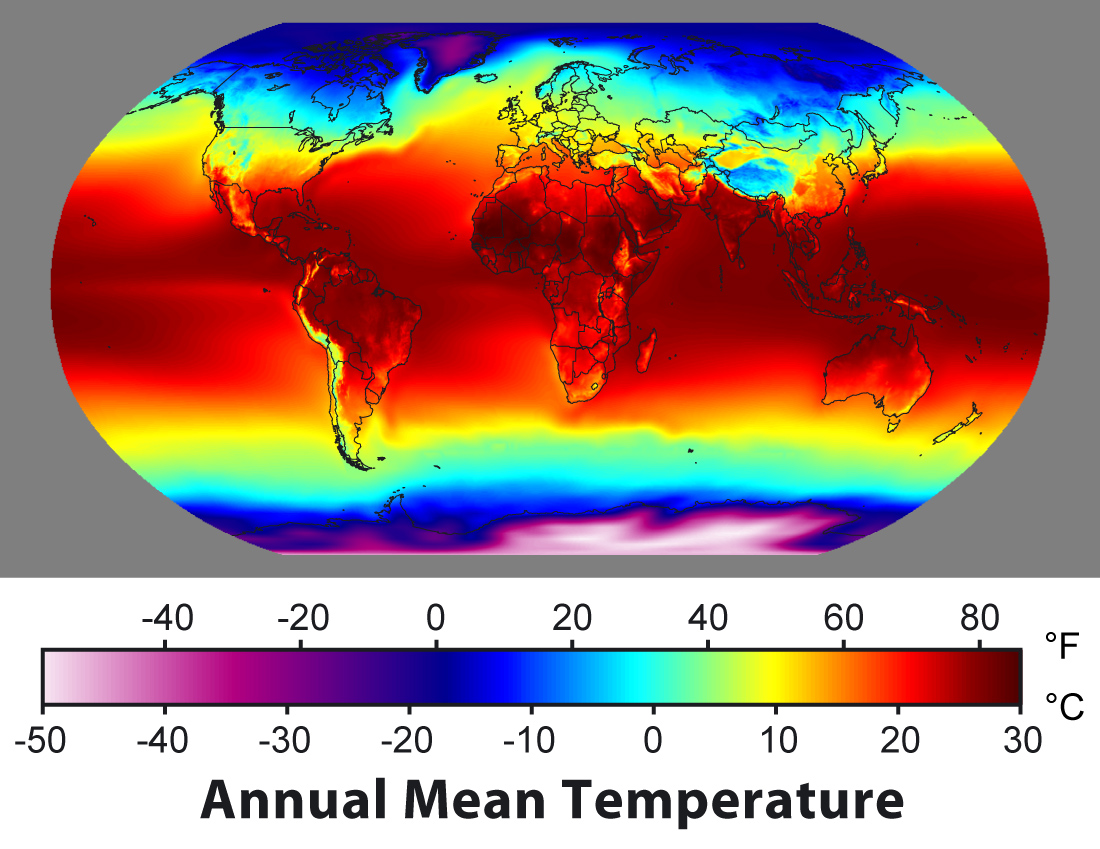
Map of the average temperature over 30 years. Data sets formed from the long-term average of historical weather parameters are sometimes called a "climatology".

Various subtopics of climatology study different aspects of climate. There are different categorizations of the sub-topics of climatology. The American Meteorological Society for instance identifies descriptive climatology, scientific climatology and applied climatology as the three subcategories of climatology, a categorization based on the complexity and the purpose of the research. Applied climatologists apply their expertise to different industries such as manufacturing and agriculture.

Paleoclimatology is the attempt to reconstruct and understand past climates by examining records such as ice cores and tree rings (dendroclimatology). Paleotempestology uses these same records to help determine hurricane frequency over millennia. Historical climatology is the study of climate as related to human history and is thus concerned mainly with the last few thousand years.

Boundary-layer climatology concerns exchanges in water, energy and momentum near surfaces. Further identified subtopics are physical climatology, dynamic climatology, tornado climatology, regional climatology, bioclimatology, and synoptic climatology. The study of the hydrological cycle over long time scales is sometimes termed hydroclimatology, in particular when studying the effects of climate change on the water cycle.

== Methods ==
The study of contemporary climates incorporates meteorological data accumulated over many years, such as records of rainfall, temperature and atmospheric composition. Knowledge of the atmosphere and its dynamics is also embodied in models, either statistical or mathematical, which help by integrating different observations and testing how well they match. Modeling is used for understanding past, present and potential future climates.

Climate research is made difficult by the large scale, long time periods, and complex processes which govern climate. Climate is governed by physical principles which can be expressed as differential equations. These equations are coupled and nonlinear, so that approximate solutions are obtained by using numerical methods to create global climate models. Climate is sometimes modeled as a stochastic process but this is generally accepted as an approximation to processes that are otherwise too complicated to analyze.

=== Climate data ===
The collection of a long record of climate variables is essential for the study of climate. Climatology deals with the aggregate data that meteorologists have recorded. Scientists use both direct and indirect observations of the climate, from Earth observing satellites and scientific instrumentation such as a global network of thermometers, to prehistoric ice extracted from glaciers. As measuring technology changes over time, records of data often cannot be compared directly. As cities are generally warmer than the areas surrounding, urbanization has made it necessary to constantly correct data for this urban heat island effect.

=== Models ===
Climate models use quantitative methods to simulate the interactions of the atmosphere, oceans, land surface, and ice. They are used for a variety of purposes from study of the dynamics of the weather and climate system to projections of future climate. All climate models balance, or very nearly balance, incoming energy as short wave (including visible) electromagnetic radiation to the Earth with outgoing energy as long wave (infrared) electromagnetic radiation from the Earth. Any unbalance results in a change of the average temperature of the Earth. Most climate models include the radiative effects of greenhouse gases such as carbon dioxide. These models predict a trend of increase of surface temperatures, as well as a more rapid increase of temperature at higher latitudes.

Models can range from relatively simple to complex:

- A simple radiant heat transfer model that treats the Earth as a single point and averages outgoing energy.
- This can be expanded vertically (radiative-convective models), or horizontally.
- Coupled atmosphere–ocean–sea ice global climate models discretise and solve the full equations for mass and energy transfer and radiant exchange.
- Earth system models further include the biosphere.

Additionally, they are available with different resolutions ranging from >100 km to 1 km. High resolutions in global climate models are computational very demanding and only few global datasets exists. Examples are ICON or mechanistically downscaled data such as CHELSA (Climatologies at high resolution for the Earth's land surface areas).

== Topics of research ==
Topics that climatologists study comprise three main categories: climate variability, mechanisms of climatic change, and modern changes of climate.

=== Climatological processes ===
Various factors affect the average state of the atmosphere at a particular location. For instance, midlatitudes will have a pronounced seasonal cycle of temperature whereas tropical regions show little variation of temperature over a year. Another major variable of climate is continentality: the distance to major water bodies such as oceans. Oceans act as a moderating factor, so that land close to them has typically less difference of temperature between winter and summer than areas further from them. The atmosphere interacts with other parts of the climate system, with winds generating ocean currents that transport heat around the globe.

=== Climate classification ===
Classification is an important method of simplifying complicated processes. Different climate classifications have been developed over the centuries, with the first ones in Ancient Greece. How climates are classified depends on what the application is. A wind energy producer will require different information (wind) in a classification than someone more interested in agriculture, for whom precipitation and temperature are more important. The most widely used classification, the Köppen climate classification, was developed during the late nineteenth century and is based on vegetation. It uses monthly data concerning temperature and precipitation.

=== Climate variability ===
There are different types of variability: recurring patterns of temperature or other climate variables. They are quantified with different indices. Much in the way the Dow Jones Industrial Average, which is based on the stock prices of 30 companies, is used to represent the fluctuations of stock prices in general, climate indices are used to represent the essential elements of climate. Climate indices are generally devised with the twin objectives of simplicity and completeness, and each index typically represents the status and timing of the climate factor it represents. By their very nature, indices are simple, and combine many details into a generalized, overall description of the atmosphere or ocean which can be used to characterize the factors which effect the global climate system.

El Niño–Southern Oscillation (ENSO) is a coupled ocean-atmosphere phenomenon in the Pacific Ocean responsible for much of the global variability of temperature, and has a cycle between two and seven years. The North Atlantic oscillation is a mode of variability that is mainly contained to the lower atmosphere, the troposphere. The layer of atmosphere above, the stratosphere is also capable of creating its own variability, most importantly the Madden–Julian oscillation (MJO), which has a cycle of approximately 30 to 60 days. The Interdecadal Pacific oscillation can create changes in the Pacific Ocean and lower atmosphere on decadal time scales.

=== Climate change ===
Climate change occurs when changes of Earth's climate system result in new weather patterns that remain for an extended period of time. This duration of time can be as brief as a few decades to as long as millions of years. The climate system receives nearly all of its energy from the sun. The climate system also gives off energy to outer space. The balance of incoming and outgoing energy, and the passage of the energy through the climate system, determines Earth's energy budget. When the incoming energy is greater than the outgoing energy, earth's energy budget is positive and the climate system is warming. If more energy goes out, the energy budget is negative and earth experiences cooling. Climate change also influences the average sea level.

Modern climate change is caused largely by the human emissions of greenhouse gas from the burning of fossil fuel which increases global mean surface temperatures. Increasing temperature is only one aspect of modern climate change, which also includes observed changes of precipitation, storm tracks and cloudiness. Warmer temperatures are causing further changes of the climate system, such as the widespread melt of glaciers, sea level rise and shifts of flora and fauna.

== Differences with meteorology ==
In contrast to meteorology, which emphasises short term weather systems lasting no more than a few weeks, climatology studies the frequency and trends of those systems. It studies the periodicity of weather events over years to millennia, as well as changes of long-term average weather patterns in relation to atmospheric conditions. Climatologists study both the nature of climates – local, regional or global – and the natural or human-induced factors that cause climates to change. Climatology considers the past and can help predict future climate change.

Phenomena of climatological interest include the atmospheric boundary layer, circulation patterns, heat transfer (radiative, convective and latent), interactions between the atmosphere and the oceans and land surface (particularly vegetation, land use and topography), and the chemical and physical composition of the atmosphere.

== Use in weather forecasting ==
A relatively difficult method of forecasting, the analog technique requires remembering a previous weather event which is expected to be mimicked by an upcoming event. What makes it a difficult technique is that there is rarely a perfect analog for an event of the future. Some refer to this type of forecasting as pattern recognition, which remains a useful method of estimating rainfall over data voids such as oceans using knowledge of how satellite imagery relates to precipitation rates over land, as well as the forecasting of precipitation amounts and distribution of the future. A variation of this theme, used for medium range forecasting, is known as teleconnections, when systems in other locations are used to help determine the location of a system within the regime surrounding. One method of using teleconnections is by using climate indices such as ENSO-related phenomena.

== See also ==
- Biogeochemistry
- Climate as complex networks
- Climatic geomorphology
- Climate reanalysis
- Geophysics
- Tropical cyclone rainfall climatology
- Urban climatology
- List of climate scientists
- List of women climate scientists and activists
- Economics of climate and weather-related investments
