= Interdependent networks =

Subfield of network science

The study of interdependent networks is a subfield of network science dealing with phenomena caused by the interactions between complex networks. Though there may be a wide variety of interactions between networks, dependency focuses on the scenario in which the nodes in one network require support from nodes in another network.

== Motivation for the model ==
In nature, networks rarely appear in isolation. They are typically elements in larger systems and can have non-trivial effects on one another. For example, infrastructure networks exhibit interdependency to a large degree. The power stations which form the nodes of the power grid require fuel delivered via a network of roads or pipes and are also controlled via the nodes of communications network. Though the transportation network does not depend on the power network to function, the communications network does. Thus the deactivation of a critical number of nodes in either the power network or the communication network can lead to a series of cascading failures across the system with potentially catastrophic repercussions. If the two networks were treated in isolation, this important feedback effect would not be seen and predictions of network robustness would be greatly overestimated.

== Dependency links ==
Links in a standard network represent connectivity, providing information about how one node can be reached from another. Dependency links represent a need for support from one node to another. This relationship is often, though not necessarily, mutual and thus the links can be directed or undirected. Crucially, a node loses its ability to function as soon as the node it is dependent on ceases to function while it may not be so severely effected by losing a node it is connected to.

== Comparison to many-particle systems in physics ==
In statistical physics, phase transitions can only appear in many particle systems. Though phase transitions are well known in network science, in single networks they are second order only. With the introduction of internetwork dependency, first order transitions emerge. This is a new phenomenon and one with profound implications for systems engineering. Where system dissolution takes place after steady (if steep) degradation for second order transitions, the existence of a first order transition implies that the system can go from a relatively healthy state to complete collapse with no advanced warning.

== Examples ==
- Infrastructure networks. The network of power stations depends on instructions from the communications network which require power themselves. Another example is the interdependence between electric and natural gas systems
- Transportation networks. The networks of airports and seaports are interdependent in that in a given city, the ability of that city's airport to function is dependent upon resources obtained from the seaport or vice versa.
- Protein networks. A biological process regulated by a number of proteins is often represented as a network. Since the same proteins participate in different processes, the networks are interdependent.
- Ecological networks. Food webs constructed from species which depend on one another are interdependent when the same species participates in different webs.
- Climate networks. Spatial measurements of different climatological variables define a network. The networks defined by different sets of variables are interdependent.

== See also ==
- 2003 Italy blackout – Power outage in Italy and Switzerland
- Cascading failure – Systemic risk of failure
- Percolation theory – Mathematical theory on behavior of connected clusters in a random graph
