= Network science =

Academic field

Network science is an academic field which studies complex networks such as telecommunication networks, computer networks, biological networks, cognitive and semantic networks, and social networks, considering distinct elements or actors represented by nodes (or vertices) and the connections between the elements or actors as links (or edges). The field draws on theories and methods including graph theory from mathematics, statistical mechanics from physics, data mining and information visualization from computer science, inferential modeling from statistics, and social structure from sociology. The United States National Research Council defines network science as "the study of network representations of physical, biological, and social phenomena leading to predictive models of these phenomena."

== Background and history ==
The study of networks has emerged in diverse disciplines as a means of analyzing complex relational data. The earliest known paper in this field is the famous Seven Bridges of Königsberg written by Leonhard Euler in 1736. Euler's mathematical description of vertices and edges was the foundation of graph theory, a branch of mathematics that studies the properties of pairwise relations in a network structure. The field of graph theory continued to develop and found applications in chemistry.

Dénes Kőnig, a Hungarian mathematician and professor, wrote the first book in Graph Theory, entitled "Theory of finite and infinite graphs", in 1936.

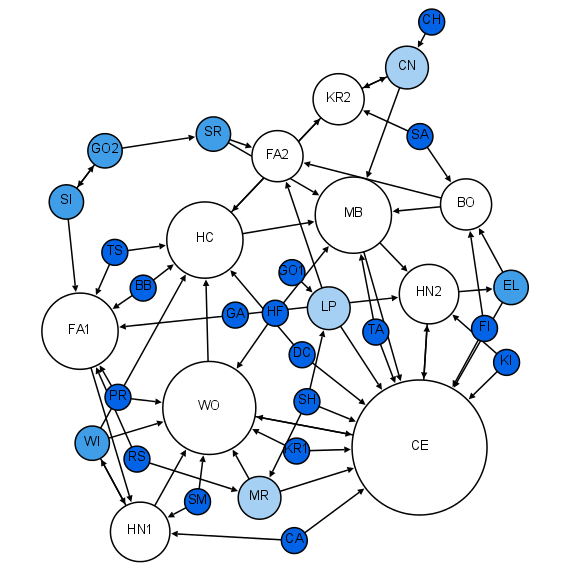
Moreno's sociogram of a 1st grade class.

In the 1930s Jacob Moreno, a psychologist in the Gestalt tradition, arrived in the United States. He developed the sociogram and presented it to the public in April 1933 at a convention of medical scholars. Moreno claimed that "before the advent of sociometry no one knew what the interpersonal structure of a group 'precisely' looked like". The sociogram was a representation of the social structure of a group of elementary school students. The boys were friends of boys and the girls were friends of girls with the exception of one boy who said he liked a single girl. The feeling was not reciprocated. This network representation of social structure was found so intriguing that it was printed in The New York Times. The sociogram has found many applications and has grown into the field of social network analysis.

Probabilistic theory in network science developed as an offshoot of graph theory with Paul Erdős and Alfréd Rényi's eight famous papers on random graphs. For social networks the exponential random graph model or p* is a notational framework used to represent the probability space of a tie occurring in a social network. An alternate approach to network probability structures is the network probability matrix, which models the probability of edges occurring in a network, based on the historic presence or absence of the edge in a sample of networks.

Interest in networks exploded around 2000, following new discoveries that offered novel mathematical framework to describe different network topologies, leading to the term 'network science'. Albert-László Barabási and Reka Albert discovered the scale-free networks nature of many real networks, from the WWW to the cell. The scale-free property captures the fact that in real network hubs coexist with many small degree vertices, and the authors offered a dynamical model to explain the origin of this scale-free state. Social networks in particular tend to be weakly scale-free. Duncan Watts and Steven Strogatz reconciled empirical data on networks with mathematical representation, describing the small-world network.

== Network classification ==
=== Deterministic network ===
The definition of deterministic network is defined compared with the definition of probabilistic network. In un-weighted deterministic networks, edges either exist or not, usually we use 0 to represent non-existence of an edge while 1 to represent existence of an edge. In weighted deterministic networks, the edge value represents the weight of each edge, for example, the strength level.

=== Probabilistic network ===
In probabilistic networks, values behind each edge represent the likelihood of the existence of each edge. For example, if one edge has a value equals to 0.9, we say the existence probability of this edge is 0.9.

== Network properties ==
Often, networks have certain attributes that can be calculated to analyze the properties & characteristics of the network. The behavior of these network properties often define network models and can be used to analyze how certain models contrast to each other. Many of the definitions for other terms used in network science can be found in Glossary of graph theory.

=== Size ===
The size of a network can refer to the number of nodes $N$ or, less commonly, the number of edges $E$ which (for connected graphs with no multi-edges) can range from $N-1$ (a tree) to $E_{\max}$ (a complete graph). In the case of a simple graph (a network in which at most one (undirected) edge exists between each pair of vertices, and in which no vertices connect to themselves), we have $E_{\max}=\tbinom N2=N(N-1)/2$; for directed graphs (with no self-connected nodes), $E_{\max}=N(N-1)$; for directed graphs with self-connections allowed, $E_{\max}=N^2$. In the circumstance of a graph within which multiple edges may exist between a pair of vertices, $E_{\max}=\infty$.

=== Density ===
The density $D$ of a network is defined as a normalized ratio between 0 and 1 of the number of edges $E$ to the number of possible edges in a network with $N$ nodes. Network density is a measure of the percentage of "optional" edges that exist in the network and can be computed as $D =\frac{E-E_{\mathrm{min}}}{E_{\mathrm{max}}-E_{\mathrm{min}}}$ where $E_{\mathrm{min}}$ and $E_{\mathrm{max}}$ are the minimum and maximum number of edges in a connected network with $N$ nodes, respectively. In the case of simple graphs, $E_{\mathrm{max}}$ is given by the binomial coefficient $\tbinom N2$ and $E_{\mathrm{min}} = N-1$, giving density $D =\frac{E-(N-1)}{E_{\mathrm{max}} - (N-1)} = \frac{2(E-N+1)}{N(N-3)+2}$. Another possible equation is $D = \frac{T-2N+2}{N(N-3)+2},$ whereas the ties $T$ are unidirectional (Wasserman & Faust 1994). This gives a better overview over the network density, because unidirectional relationships can be measured.

=== Planar network density ===
The density $D$ of a network, where there is no intersection between edges, is defined as a ratio of the number of edges $E$ to the number of possible edges in a network with $N$ nodes, given by a graph with no intersecting edges $(E_{\max}=3N-6)$, giving $D = \frac{E-N+1}{2N-5}.$

=== Average degree ===
The degree $k$ of a node is the number of edges connected to it. Closely related to the density of a network is the average degree, $\langle k\rangle = \tfrac{2E}{N}$ (or, in the case of directed graphs, $\langle k\rangle = \tfrac{E}{N}$, the former factor of 2 arising from each edge in an undirected graph contributing to the degree of two distinct vertices). In the ER random graph model ($G(N,p)$) we can compute the expected value of $\langle k \rangle$ (equal to the expected value of $k$ of an arbitrary vertex): a random vertex has $N-1$ other vertices in the network available, and with probability $p$, connects to each. Thus, $\mathbb{E}[\langle k \rangle]=\mathbb{E}[k]= p(N-1)$.

=== Degree distribution ===
The degree distribution $P(k)$ is a fundamental property of both real networks, such as the Internet and social networks, and of theoretical models. The degree distribution P(k) of a network is defined to be the fraction of nodes in the network with degree k. The simplest network model, for example, the (Erdős–Rényi model) random graph, in which each of n nodes is independently connected (or not) with probability p (or 1 − p), has a binomial distribution of degrees k (or Poisson in the limit of large n). Most real networks, from the WWW to protein interaction networks, however, have a degree distribution that are highly right-skewed, meaning that a large majority of nodes have low degree but a small number, known as "hubs", have high degree. For such scale-free networks the degree distribution approximately follows a power law: $P(k)\sim k^{-\gamma}$, where γ is the degree exponent, and is a constant. Such scale-free networks have unexpected structural and dynamical properties, rooted in the diverging second moment of the degree distribution.

=== Average shortest path length (or characteristic path length) ===
The average shortest path length is calculated by finding the shortest path between all pairs of nodes, and taking the average over all paths of the length thereof (the length being the number of intermediate edges contained in the path, i.e., the distance $d_{u,v}$ between the two vertices $u,v$ within the graph). This shows us, on average, the number of steps it takes to get from one member of the network to another. The behavior of the expected average shortest path length (that is, the ensemble average of the average shortest path length) as a function of the number of vertices $N$ of a random network model defines whether that model exhibits the small-world effect; if it scales as $O(\ln N)$, the model generates small-world nets. For faster-than-logarithmic growth, the model does not produce small worlds. The special case of $O(\ln\ln N)$ is known as ultra-small world effect.

=== Diameter of a network ===
As another means of measuring network graphs, we can define the diameter of a network as the longest of all the calculated shortest paths in a network. It is the shortest distance between the two most distant nodes in the network. In other words, once the shortest path length from every node to all other nodes is calculated, the diameter is the longest of all the calculated path lengths. The diameter is representative of the linear size of a network. If node A-B-C-D are connected, going from A->D this would be the diameter of 3 (3-hops, 3-links).

=== Clustering coefficient ===
The clustering coefficient is a measure of an "all-my-friends-know-each-other" property. This is sometimes described as the friends of my friends are my friends. More precisely, the clustering coefficient of a node is the ratio of existing links connecting a node's neighbors to each other to the maximum possible number of such links. The clustering coefficient for the entire network is the average of the clustering coefficients of all the nodes. A high clustering coefficient for a network is another indication of a small world.

The clustering coefficient of the $i$'th node is

$$C_i = {2e_i\over k_i{(k_i - 1)}}\,,$$

where $k_i$ is the number of neighbours of the $i$'th node, and $e_i$ is the number of connections between these neighbours. The maximum possible number of connections between neighbors is, then,

$${\binom {k}{2}} = {{k(k-1)}\over 2}\,.$$

From a probabilistic standpoint, the expected local clustering coefficient is the likelihood of a link existing between two arbitrary neighbors of the same node.

=== Connectedness ===
The way in which a network is connected plays a large part into how networks are analyzed and interpreted. Networks are classified in four different categories:

- Clique/Complete Graph: a completely connected network, where all nodes are connected to every other node. These networks are symmetric in that all nodes have in-links and out-links from all others.
- Giant Component: A single connected component which contains most of the nodes in the network.
- Weakly Connected Component: A collection of nodes in which there exists a path from any node to any other, ignoring directionality of the edges.
- Strongly Connected Component: A collection of nodes in which there exists a directed path from any node to any other.

=== Node centrality ===
Centrality indices produce rankings which seek to identify the most important nodes in a network model. Different centrality indices encode different contexts for the word "importance." The betweenness centrality, for example, considers a node highly important if it form bridges between many other nodes. The eigenvalue centrality, in contrast, considers a node highly important if many other highly important nodes link to it. Hundreds of such measures have been proposed in the literature.

Centrality indices are only accurate for identifying the most important nodes. The measures are seldom, if ever, meaningful for the remainder of network nodes. Also, their indications are only accurate within their assumed context for importance, and tend to "get it wrong" for other contexts. For example, imagine two separate communities whose only link is an edge between the most junior member of each community. Since any transfer from one community to the other must go over this link, the two junior members will have high betweenness centrality. But, since they are junior, (presumably) they have few connections to the "important" nodes in their community, meaning their eigenvalue centrality would be quite low.

=== Node influence ===
Limitations to centrality measures have led to the development of more general measures. Two examples are the accessibility, which uses the diversity of random walks to measure how accessible the rest of the network is from a given start node, and the expected force, derived from the expected value of the force of infection generated by a node. Both of these measures can be meaningfully computed from the structure of the network alone.

=== Community structure ===
Fig. 1: A sketch of a small network displaying community structure, with three groups of nodes with dense internal connections and sparser connections between groups.

Nodes in a network may be partitioned into groups representing communities. Depending on the context, communities may be distinct or overlapping. Typically, nodes in such communities will be strongly connected to other nodes in the same community, but weakly connected to nodes outside the community. In the absence of a ground truth describing the community structure of a specific network, several algorithms have been developed to infer possible community structures using either supervised of unsupervised clustering methods.

== Network models ==
Network models serve as a foundation to understanding interactions within empirical complex networks. Various random graph generation models produce network structures that may be used in comparison to real-world complex networks.

=== Erdős–Rényi random graph model ===
This Erdős–Rényi model is generated with N = 4 nodes. For each edge in the complete graph formed by all N nodes, a random number is generated and compared to a given probability. If the random number is less than p, an edge is formed on the model.

The Erdős–Rényi model, named for Paul Erdős and Alfréd Rényi, is used for generating random graphs in which edges are set between nodes with equal probabilities. It can be used in the probabilistic method to prove the existence of graphs satisfying various properties, or to provide a rigorous definition of what it means for a property to hold for almost all graphs.

To generate an Erdős–Rényi model $G(n, p)$ two parameters must be specified: the total number of nodes n and the probability p that a random pair of nodes has an edge.

Because the model is generated without bias to particular nodes, the degree distribution is binomial: for a randomly chosen vertex $v$,

$$P(\deg(v) = k) = {n-1\choose k} p^k (1-p)^{n-1-k}.$$

In this model the clustering coefficient is 0 a.s. The behavior of $G(n, p)$ can be broken into three regions.

Subcritical $n p < 1$: All components are simple and very small, the largest component has size $|C_1| = O(\log n)$;

Critical $n p = 1$: $|C_1| = O(n^\frac{2}{3})$;

Supercritical $n p >1$:$|C_1| \approx yn$ where $y = y(n p)$ is the positive solution to the equation $e^{-p n y }=1-y$.

The largest connected component has high complexity. All other components are simple and small $|C_2| = O(\log n)$.

=== Configuration model ===
The configuration model takes a degree sequence or degree distribution (which subsequently is used to generate a degree sequence) as the input, and produces randomly connected graphs in all respects other than the degree sequence. This means that for a given choice of the degree sequence, the graph is chosen uniformly at random from the set of all graphs that comply with this degree sequence. The degree $k$ of a randomly chosen vertex is an independent and identically distributed random variable with integer values. When $\mathbb E [k^2] - 2 \mathbb E [k]>0$, the configuration graph contains the giant connected component, which has infinite size. The rest of the components have finite sizes, which can be quantified with the notion of the size distribution. The probability $w(n)$ that a randomly sampled node is connected to a component of size $n$ is given by convolution powers of the degree distribution:
$$w(n)=\begin{cases}
\frac{\mathbb E [k]}{n-1} u_1^{*n}(n-2),& n>1, \\
u(0) & n=1,
\end{cases}$$
where $u(k)$ denotes the degree distribution and $u_1(k)=\frac{(k+1)u(k+1)}{\mathbb E[k]}$. The giant component can be destroyed by randomly removing the critical fraction $p_c$ of all edges. This process is called percolation on random networks. When the second moment of the degree distribution is finite, $\mathbb E [k^2]<\infty$, this critical edge fraction is given by $p_c=1-\frac{\mathbb E[k]}{ \mathbb E [k^2] - \mathbb E[k]}$, and the average vertex-vertex distance $l$ in the giant component scales logarithmically with the total size of the network, $l = O(\log N)$.

In the directed configuration model, the degree of a node is given by two numbers, in-degree $k_\text{in}$ and out-degree $k_\text{out}$, and consequently, the degree distribution is two-variate. The expected number of in-edges and out-edges coincides, so that $\mathbb E [k_\text{in}]=\mathbb E [k_\text{out}]$. The directed configuration model contains the giant component iff
$$2\mathbb{E}[k_\text{in}]
\mathbb{E}[k_\text{in}k_\text{out}]
- \mathbb{E}[k_\text{in}]
\mathbb{E}[k_\text{out}^2]
- \mathbb{E}[k_\text{in}]
\mathbb{E}[k_\text{in}^2]
+\mathbb{E}[k_\text{in}^2] \mathbb{E}[k_\text{out}^2]
- \mathbb{E}[k_\text{in} k_\text{out}]^2 >0.$$
Note that $\mathbb E [k_\text{in}]$ and $\mathbb E [k_\text{out}]$ are equal and therefore interchangeable in the latter inequality. The probability that a randomly chosen vertex belongs to a component of size $n$ is given by:
$$h_\text{in}(n)=\frac{\mathbb E[k_{in}]}{n-1} \tilde u_\text{in}^{*n}(n-2),  \;n>1, \; \tilde u_\text{in}=\frac{k_\text{in}+1}{\mathbb E[k_\text{in}]}\sum\limits_{k_\text{out}\geq 0}u(k_\text{in}+1,k_\text{out}),$$
for in-components, and

$$h_\text{out}(n)=\frac{\mathbb E[k_\text{out}]}{n-1} \tilde u_\text{out}^{*n}(n-2),  \;n>1, \;\tilde u_\text{out}=\frac{k_\text{out}+1}{\mathbb E[k_\text{out}]}\sum\limits_{k_\text{in}\geq0}u(k_\text{in},k_\text{out}+1),$$

for out-components.

=== Watts–Strogatz small world model ===
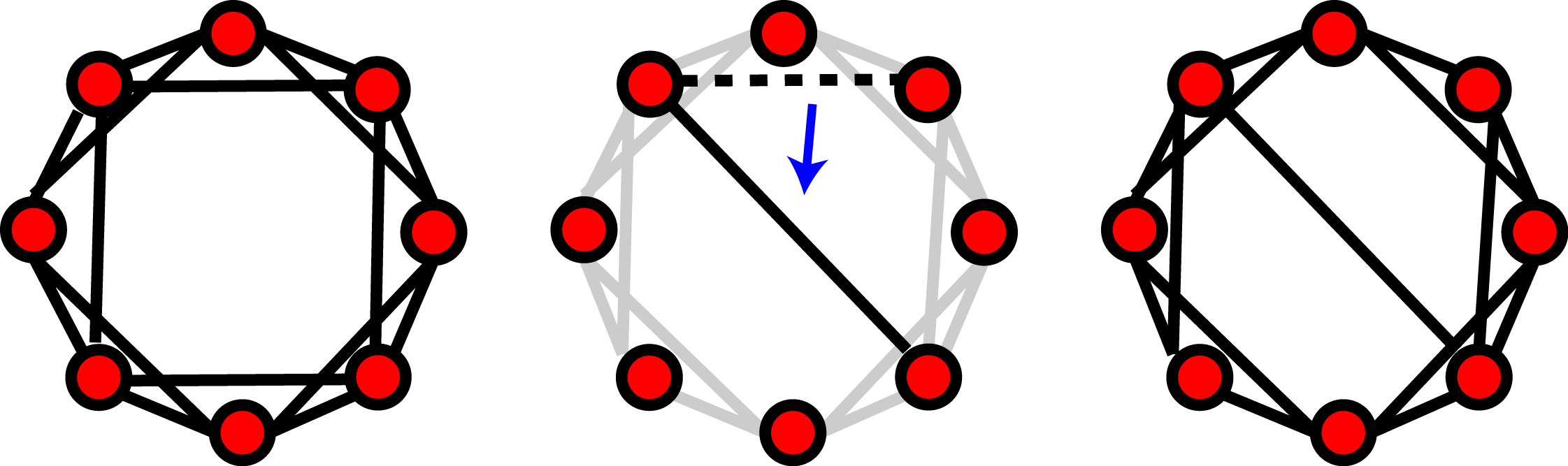
The Watts and Strogatz model uses the concept of rewiring to achieve its structure. The model generator will iterate through each edge in the original lattice structure. An edge may change its connected vertices according to a given rewiring probability. $\langle k\rangle = 4$ in this example.

The Watts and Strogatz model is a random graph generation model that produces graphs with small-world properties.

An initial lattice structure is used to generate a Watts–Strogatz model. Each node in the network is initially linked to its $\langle k\rangle$ closest neighbors. Another parameter is specified as the rewiring probability. Each edge has a probability $p$ that it will be rewired to the graph as a random edge. The expected number of rewired links in the model is $pE = pN\langle k\rangle/2$.

As the Watts–Strogatz model begins as a non-random lattice structure, it has a very high clustering coefficient along with a high average path length. Each rewire is likely to create a shortcut between highly connected clusters. As the rewiring probability increases, the clustering coefficient decreases slower than the average path length. In effect, this allows the average path length of the network to decrease significantly with only slight decreases in the clustering coefficient. Higher values of p force more rewired edges, which, in effect, makes the Watts–Strogatz model a random network.

=== Barabási–Albert (BA) preferential attachment model ===
The Barabási–Albert model is a random network model used to demonstrate a preferential attachment or a "rich-get-richer" effect. In this model, an edge is most likely to attach to nodes with higher degrees. The network begins with an initial network of m_{0} nodes. m_{0} ≥ 2 and the degree of each node in the initial network should be at least 1, otherwise it will always remain disconnected from the rest of the network.

In the BA model, new nodes are added to the network one at a time. Each new node is connected to $m$ existing nodes with a probability that is proportional to the number of links that the existing nodes already have. Formally, the probability p_{i} that the new node is connected to node i is

$$p_i = \frac{k_i}{\sum_j k_j},$$

where k_{i} is the degree of node i. Heavily linked nodes ("hubs") tend to quickly accumulate even more links, while nodes with only a few links are unlikely to be chosen as the destination for a new link. The new nodes have a "preference" to attach themselves to the already heavily linked nodes.

The degree distribution of the BA Model, which follows a power law. In loglog scale the power law function is a straight line.

The degree distribution resulting from the BA model is scale free, in particular, for large degree it is a power law of the form:

$$P(k)\sim k^{-3} \,$$

Hubs exhibit high betweenness centrality which allows short paths to exist between nodes. As a result, the BA model tends to have very short average path lengths. The clustering coefficient of this model also tends to 0.

The Barabási–Albert model was developed for undirected networks, aiming to explain the universality of the scale-free property, and applied to a wide range of different networks and applications. The directed version of this model is the Price model which was developed to just citation networks.

==== Non-linear preferential attachment ====
In non-linear preferential attachment (NLPA), existing nodes in the network gain new edges proportionally to the node degree raised to a constant positive power, $\alpha$. Formally, this means that the probability that node $i$ gains a new edge is given by

$$p_i = \frac{k_i^{\alpha}}{\sum_j k_j^{\alpha}}.$$

If $\alpha=1$, NLPA reduces to the BA model and is referred to as "linear". If $0<\alpha<1$, NLPA is referred to as "sub-linear" and the degree distribution of the network tends to a stretched exponential distribution. If $\alpha>1$, NLPA is referred to as "super-linear" and a small number of nodes connect to almost all other nodes in the network. For both $\alpha<1$ and $\alpha>1$, the scale-free property of the network is broken in the limit of infinite system size. However, if $\alpha$ is only slightly larger than $1$, NLPA may result in degree distributions which appear to be transiently scale free.

=== Fitness model ===
Another model where the key ingredient is the nature of the vertex has been introduced by Caldarelli et al. Here a link is created between two vertices $i,j$ with a probability given by a linking function $f(\eta_i,\eta_j)$ of the fitnesses of the vertices involved. The degree of a vertex i is given by

$$k(\eta_i)=N\int_0^\infty f(\eta_i,\eta_j) \rho(\eta_j) \, d\eta_j$$

If $k(\eta_i)$ is an invertible and increasing function of $\eta_i$, then the probability distribution $P(k)$ is given by

$$P(k)=\rho(\eta(k)) \cdot \eta'(k)$$

As a result, if the fitnesses $\eta$ are distributed as a power law, then also the node degree does.

Less intuitively with a fast decaying probability distribution as $\rho(\eta)=e^{-\eta}$ together with a linking function of the kind

$$f(\eta_i,\eta_j)=\Theta(\eta_i+\eta_j-Z)$$

with $Z$ a constant and $\Theta$ the Heavyside function, we also obtain scale-free networks.

Such model has been successfully applied to describe trade between nations by using GDP as fitness for the various nodes $i,j$ and a linking function of the kind

$$\frac{\delta \eta_i\eta_j}{1+ \delta \eta_i\eta_j}.$$

=== Exponential random graph models ===
Exponential family random graph models (ERGMs) are a family of statistical models for analyzing data from social and other networks. The Exponential family is a broad family of models for covering many types of data, not just networks. An ERGM is a model from this family which describes networks.

We adopt the notation to represent a random graph $Y \in \mathcal{Y}$ via a set of $n$ nodes and a collection of tie variables $\{ Y_{ij}: i=1,\dots,n; j=1,\dots,n\}$, indexed by pairs of nodes $ij$, where $Y_{ij}=1$ if the nodes $(i,j)$ are connected by an edge and $Y_{ij}=0$ otherwise.

The basic assumption of ERGMs is that the structure in an observed graph $y$ can be explained by a given vector of sufficient statistics $s(y)$ which are a function of the observed network and, in some cases, nodal attributes. The probability of a graph $y\in\mathcal{Y}$ in an ERGM is defined by:

$P(Y = y | \theta) = \frac{\exp(\theta^{T} s(y))}{c(\theta)}$

where $\theta$ is a vector of model parameters associated with $s(y)$ and $c(\theta) = \sum_{y'\in\mathcal{Y}}\exp(\theta^{T} s(y'))$ is a normalising constant.

== Network analysis ==
=== Social network analysis ===
Social network analysis examines the structure of relationships between social entities. These entities are often persons, but may also be groups, organizations, nation states, web sites, scholarly publications.

Since the 1970s, the empirical study of networks has played a central role in social science, and many of the mathematical and statistical tools used for studying networks have been first developed in sociology. Amongst many other applications, social network analysis has been used to understand the diffusion of innovation, news and rumors. Similarly, it has been used to examine the spread of both diseases and health-related behaviors. It has also been applied to the study of markets, where it has been used to examine the role of trust in exchange relationships and of social mechanisms in setting prices. Similarly, it has been used to study recruitment into political movements and social organizations. It has also been used to conceptualize scientific disagreements as well as academic prestige. More recently, network analysis (and its close cousin traffic analysis) has gained a significant use in military intelligence, for uncovering insurgent networks of both hierarchical and leaderless nature. In criminology, it is being used to identify influential actors in criminal gangs, offender movements, co-offending, predict criminal activities and make policies.

=== Dynamic network analysis ===
Dynamic network analysis examines the shifting structure of relationships among different classes of entities in complex socio-technical systems effects, and reflects social stability and changes such as the emergence of new groups, topics, and leaders. Dynamic network analysis focuses on meta-networks composed of multiple types of nodes (entities) and multiple types of links. These entities can be highly varied. Examples include people, organizations, topics, resources, tasks, events, locations, and beliefs.

Dynamic network techniques are particularly useful for assessing trends and changes in networks over time, identification of emergent leaders, and examining the co-evolution of people and ideas.

=== Biological network analysis ===
With the recent explosion of publicly available high throughput biological data, the analysis of molecular networks has gained significant interest. The type of analysis in this content are closely related to social network analysis, but often focusing on local patterns in the network. For example, network motifs are small subgraphs that are over-represented in the network. Activity motifs are similar over-represented patterns in the attributes of nodes and edges in the network that are over represented given the network structure. The analysis of biological networks has led to the development of network medicine, which looks at the effect of diseases in the interactome.

=== Semantic network analysis ===
Semantic network analysis is a sub-field of network analysis that focuses on the relationships between words and concepts in a network. Words are represented as nodes and their proximity or co-occurrences in the text are represented as edges. Semantic networks are therefore graphical representations of knowledge and are commonly used in neurolinguistics and natural language processing applications. Semantic network analysis is also used as a method to analyze large texts and identify the main themes and topics (e.g., of social media posts), to reveal biases (e.g., in news coverage), or even to map an entire research field.

=== Link analysis ===
Link analysis is a subset of network analysis, exploring associations between objects. An example may be examining the addresses of suspects and victims, the telephone numbers they have dialed, financial transactions they have partaken in during a given timeframe, and the familial relationships between these subjects as a part of the police investigation. Link analysis here provides the crucial relationships and associations between objects of different types that are not apparent from isolated pieces of information. Computer-assisted or fully automatic computer-based link analysis is increasingly employed by banks and insurance agencies in fraud detection, by telecommunication operators in telecommunication network analysis, by medical sector in epidemiology and pharmacology, in law enforcement investigations, by search engines for relevance rating (and conversely by the spammers for spamdexing and by business owners for search engine optimization), and everywhere else where relationships between many objects have to be analyzed.

=== Pandemic analysis ===
The SIR model is one of the most well known algorithms on predicting the spread of global pandemics within an infectious population.

==== Susceptible to infected ====
$$S = \beta\left(\frac 1 N \right)$$

The formula above describes the "force" of infection for each susceptible unit in an infectious population, where β is equivalent to the transmission rate of said disease.

To track the change of those susceptible in an infectious population:

$$\Delta S = \beta \times S {1\over N} \, \Delta t$$

==== Infected to recovered ====
$$\Delta I = \mu I \, \Delta t$$

Over time, the number of those infected fluctuates by: the specified rate of recovery, represented by $\mu$ but deducted to one over the average infectious period ${1\over \tau}$, the number of infectious individuals, $I$, and the change in time, $\Delta t$.

==== Infectious period ====
Whether a population will be overcome by a pandemic, with regards to the SIR model, is dependent on the value of $R_0$ or the "average people infected by an infected individual."

$$R_0 = \beta\tau = {\beta\over\mu}$$

=== Web link analysis ===
Several Web search ranking algorithms use link-based centrality metrics, including (in order of appearance) Marchiori's Hyper Search, Google's PageRank, Kleinberg's HITS algorithm, the CheiRank and TrustRank algorithms. Link analysis is also conducted in information science and communication science in order to understand and extract information from the structure of collections of web pages. For example, the analysis might be of the interlinking between politicians' web sites or blogs.

==== PageRank ====
PageRank works by randomly picking "nodes" or websites and then with a certain probability, "randomly jumping" to other nodes. By randomly jumping to these other nodes, it helps PageRank completely traverse the network as some webpages exist on the periphery and would not as readily be assessed.

Each node, $x_i$, has a PageRank as defined by the sum of pages $j$ that link to $i$ times one over the outlinks or "out-degree" of $j$ times the "importance" or PageRank of $j$.

$$x_i = \sum_{j\rightarrow i}{1\over N_j}x_j^{(k)}$$

===== Random jumping =====
As explained above, PageRank enlists random jumps in attempts to assign PageRank to every website on the internet. These random jumps find websites that might not be found during the normal search methodologies such as breadth-first search and depth-first search.

In an improvement over the aforementioned formula for determining PageRank includes adding these random jump components. Without the random jumps, some pages would receive a PageRank of 0 which would not be good.

The first is $\alpha$, or the probability that a random jump will occur. Contrasting is the "damping factor", or $1 - \alpha$.

$$R{(p)} = {\alpha\over N} + (1 - \alpha) \sum_{j\rightarrow i} {1\over N_j} x_j^{(k)}$$

Another way of looking at it:

$$R(A) = \sum {R_B\over B_\text{(outlinks)}} + \cdots + {R_n \over n_\text{(outlinks)}}$$

=== Centrality measures ===
Information about the relative importance of nodes and edges in a graph can be obtained through centrality measures, widely used in disciplines like sociology. Centrality measures are essential when a network analysis has to answer questions such as: "Which nodes in the network should be targeted to ensure that a message or information spreads to all or most nodes in the network?" or conversely, "Which nodes should be targeted to curtail the spread of a disease?". Formally established measures of centrality are degree centrality, closeness centrality, betweenness centrality, eigenvector centrality, and katz centrality. The objective of network analysis generally determines the type of centrality measure(s) to be used.

- Degree centrality of a node in a network is the number of links (vertices) incident on the node.
- Closeness centrality determines how "close" a node is to other nodes in a network by measuring the sum of the shortest distances (geodesic paths) between that node and all other nodes in the network.
- Betweenness centrality determines the relative importance of a node by measuring the amount of traffic flowing through that node to other nodes in the network. This is done by measuring the fraction of paths connecting all pairs of nodes and containing the node of interest. Group Betweenness centrality measures the amount of traffic flowing through a group of nodes.
- Eigenvector centrality is a more sophisticated version of degree centrality where the centrality of a node not only depends on the number of links incident on the node but also the quality of those links. This quality factor is determined by the eigenvectors of the adjacency matrix of the network.
- Katz centrality of a node is measured by summing the geodesic paths between that node and all (reachable) nodes in the network. These paths are weighted, paths connecting the node with its immediate neighbors carry higher weights than those which connect with nodes farther away from the immediate neighbors.

== Spread of content in networks ==
Content in a complex network can spread via two major methods: conserved spread and non-conserved spread. In conserved spread, the total amount of content that enters a complex network remains constant as it passes through. The model of conserved spread can best be represented by a pitcher containing a fixed amount of water being poured into a series of funnels connected by tubes. The pitcher represents the source, and the water represents the spread content. The funnels and connecting tubing represent the nodes and the connections between nodes, respectively. As the water passes from one funnel into another, the water disappears instantly from the funnel that was previously exposed to the water. In non-conserved spread, the content changes as it enters and passes through a complex network. The model of non-conserved spread can best be represented by a continuously running faucet running through a series of funnels connected by tubes. Here, the amount of water from the source is infinite. Also, any funnels exposed to the water continue to experience the water even as it passes into successive funnels. The non-conserved model is the most suitable for explaining the transmission of most infectious diseases.

=== The SIR model ===
In 1927, W. O. Kermack and A. G. McKendrick created a model in which they considered a fixed population with only three compartments, susceptible: $S(t)$, infected, $I(t)$, and recovered, $R(t)$. The compartments used for this model consist of three classes:

- $S(t)$ is used to represent the number of individuals not yet infected with the disease at time t, or those susceptible to the disease
- $I(t)$ denotes the number of individuals who have been infected with the disease and are capable of spreading the disease to those in the susceptible category
- $R(t)$ is the compartment used for those individuals who have been infected and then recovered from the disease. Those in this category are not able to be infected again or to transmit the infection to others.

The flow of this model may be considered as follows:

$$\mathcal{S} \rightarrow \mathcal{I} \rightarrow \mathcal{R}$$

Using a fixed population, $N = S(t) + I(t) + R(t)$, Kermack and McKendrick derived the following equations:

$$\begin{align}
\frac{dS}{dt} & = - \beta S I \\[8pt]
\frac{dI}{dt} & = \beta S I - \gamma I \\[8pt]
\frac{dR}{dt} & = \gamma I
\end{align}$$

Several assumptions were made in the formulation of these equations: First, an individual in the population must be considered as having an equal probability as every other individual of contracting the disease with a rate of $\beta$, which is considered the contact or infection rate of the disease. Therefore, an infected individual makes contact and is able to transmit the disease with $\beta N$ others per unit time and the fraction of contacts by an infected with a susceptible is $S/N$. The number of new infections in unit time per infective then is $\beta N (S/N)$, giving the rate of new infections (or those leaving the susceptible category) as $\beta N (S/N)I = \beta SI$ (Brauer & Castillo-Chavez, 2001). For the second and third equations, consider the population leaving the susceptible class as equal to the number entering the infected class. However, infectives are leaving this class per unit time to enter the recovered/removed class at a rate $\gamma$ per unit time (where $\gamma$ represents the mean recovery rate, or $1/\gamma$ the mean infective period). These processes which occur simultaneously are referred to as the Law of Mass Action, a widely accepted idea that the rate of contact between two groups in a population is proportional to the size of each of the groups concerned (Daley & Gani, 2005). Finally, it is assumed that the rate of infection and recovery is much faster than the time scale of births and deaths and therefore, these factors are ignored in this model.

More can be read on this model on the Epidemic model page.

=== The master equation approach ===
A master equation can express the behaviour of an undirected growing network where, at each time step, a new node is added to the network, linked to an old node (randomly chosen and without preference). The initial network is formed by two nodes and two links between them at time $t = 2$, this configuration is necessary only to simplify further calculations, so at time $t = n$ the network have $n$ nodes and $n$ links.

The master equation for this network is:

$$p(k,s,t+1) = \frac 1 t p(k-1,s,t) + \left(1 - \frac 1 t \right)p(k,s,t),$$

where $p(k,s,t)$ is the probability to have the node $s$ with degree $k$ at time $t+1$, and $s$ is the time step when this node was added to the network. Note that there are only two ways for an old node $s$ to have $k$ links at time $t+1$:

- The node $s$ have degree $k-1$ at time $t$ and will be linked by the new node with probability $1/t$
- Already has degree $k$ at time $t$ and will not be linked by the new node.

After simplifying this model, the degree distribution is $P(k) = 2^{-k}.$

Based on this growing network, an epidemic model is developed following a simple rule: Each time the new node is added and after choosing the old node to link, a decision is made: whether or not this new node will be infected. The master equation for this epidemic model is:

$$p_r(k,s,t) = r_t \frac 1 t p_r(k-1,s,t) + \left(1 - \frac 1 t \right) p_r(k,s,t),$$

where $r_t$ represents the decision to infect ($r_t = 1$) or not ($r_t = 0$). Solving this master equation, the following solution is obtained: $\tilde{P}_r(k) = \left(\frac r 2 \right)^k.$

== Multilayer networks ==
Multilayer networks are networks with multiple kinds of relations. Attempts to model real-world systems as multidimensional networks have been used in various fields such as social network analysis, economics, history, urban and international transport, ecology, psychology, medicine, biology, commerce, climatology, physics, computational neuroscience, operations management, and finance.

== Network optimization ==
Network problems that involve finding an optimal way of doing something are studied under the name of combinatorial optimization. Examples include network flow, shortest path problem, transport problem, transshipment problem, location problem, matching problem, assignment problem, packing problem, routing problem, critical path analysis and PERT (program evaluation and review technique).

== Interdependent networks ==
Interdependent networks are networks where the functioning of nodes in one network depends on the functioning of nodes in another network. In nature, networks rarely appear in isolation, rather, usually networks are typically elements in larger systems, and interact with elements in that complex system. Such complex dependencies can have non-trivial effects on one another. A well studied example is the interdependency of infrastructure networks, the power stations which form the nodes of the power grid require fuel delivered via a network of roads or pipes and are also controlled via the nodes of communications network. Though the transportation network does not depend on the power network to function, the communications network does. In such infrastructure networks, the disfunction of a critical number of nodes in either the power network or the communication network can lead to cascading failures across the system with potentially catastrophic result to the whole system functioning. If the two networks were treated in isolation, this important feedback effect would not be seen and predictions of network robustness would be greatly overestimated.

== See also ==
- Cascading failure
- Climate as complex networks
- Collaborative innovation network
- Communicative ecology
- Complex network
- Core-periphery structures in networks
- Dual-phase evolution
- Erdős–Rényi model
- Glossary of graph theory
- Gradient network
- Higher category theory
- Immune network theory
- Irregular warfare
- Network analyzer
- Network dynamics
- Network formation
- Network theory in risk assessment
- Network topology
- Networks in labor economics
- Non-linear preferential attachment
- Percolation
- Percolation theory
- Policy network analysis
- Polytely
- Quantum complex network
- Random networks
- Rumor spread in social network
- Scale-free networks
- Sequential dynamical system
- Service network
- Small-world networks
- Structural cut-off
- Systems theory
