= Six Degrees: The Science of a Connected Age =

Book by Duncan J. Watts

Six Degrees: The Science of a Connected Age (2004 in paperback, ISBN 0-393-32542-3 and 2003 in hardcover, ISBN 0-393-04142-5) is a popular science book by Duncan J. Watts covering the application of network theory to sociology.

The book covers Watts' own work on small-world networks, and continues on to cover scale-free networks, network searching, epidemics and network failures, social decision-making, thresholds in networks, and innovation in large organizations and its lack.

In addition to covering the theoretical models and empirical case studies, the book also includes several stories about the character of the researchers who developed this science and their relationships with each other.

The case studies used include blackouts in the North American electricity distribution network, the relationships among members of corporate boards of directors, the distribution of wealth in societies, peer-to-peer file-sharing systems, computer viruses, economic bubbles, and the 1997 Aisin fire crisis at Toyota.

== See also ==
- Social network
