= Average path length =

Concept in network topology

Average path length of the bipartite graph and the cube graph.

Average path length, or average shortest path length is a concept in network topology that is defined as the average number of steps along the shortest paths for all possible pairs of network nodes. It is a measure of the efficiency of information or mass transport on a network.

== Concept ==
Average path length is one of the three most robust measures of network topology, along with its clustering coefficient and its degree distribution. Some examples are: the average number of clicks which will lead you from one website to another, or the number of people you will have to communicate through, on an average, to contact a complete stranger. It should not be confused with the diameter of the network, which is defined as the longest geodesic, i.e., the longest shortest path between any two nodes in the network (see Distance (graph theory)).

The average path length distinguishes an easily negotiable network from one, which is complicated and inefficient, with a shorter average path length being more desirable. However, the average path length is simply what the path length will most likely be. The network itself might have some very remotely connected nodes and many nodes, which are neighbors of each other.

== Definition ==
Consider an unweighted directed graph $G$ with the set of vertices $V$. Let $d(v_1, v_2)$, where $v_1, v_2 \in V$ denote the shortest distance between $v_1$ and $v_2$. Assume that $d(v_1, v_2) = 0$ if $v_2$ cannot be reached from $v_1$. Then, the average path length $l_G$ is:

$l_G = \frac{1}{n \cdot (n - 1)} \cdot \sum_{i \ne j} d(v_i, v_j),$

where $n$ is the number of vertices in $G$.

== Applications ==
In a real network like the Internet, a short average path length facilitates the quick transfer of information and reduces costs. The efficiency of mass transfer in a metabolic network can be judged by studying its average path length. A power grid network will have fewer losses if its average path length is minimized.

Most real networks have a very short average path length leading to the concept of a small world where everyone is connected to everyone else through a very short path.

As a result, most models of real networks are created with this condition in mind. One of the first models which tried to explain real networks was the random network model. It was later followed by the Watts and Strogatz model, and even later there were the scale-free networks starting with the BA model. All these models had one thing in common: they all predicted very short average path length.

The average path length depends on the system size but does not change drastically with it. Small world network theory predicts that the average path length changes proportionally to log n, where n is the number of nodes in the network.
