= Watts–Strogatz model =

Method of generating random small-world graphs

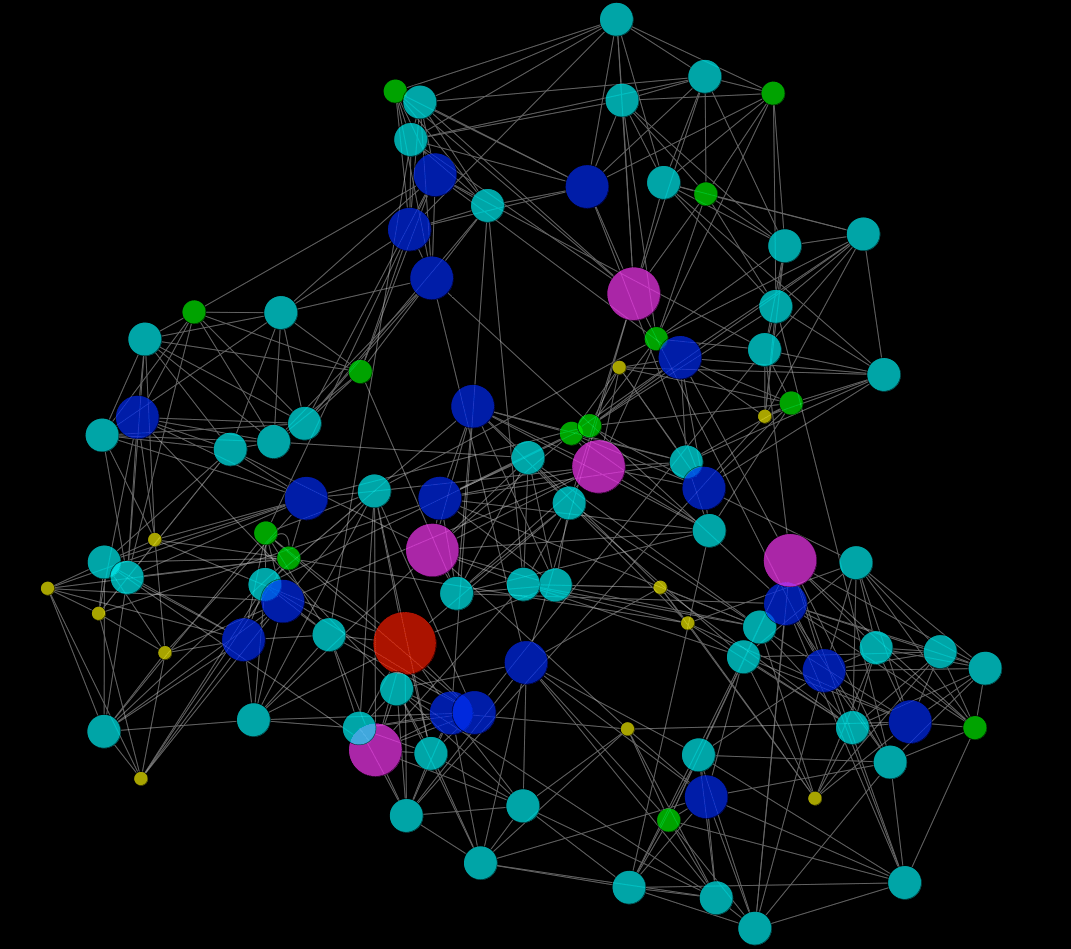
Watts–Strogatz small-world model generated by igraph and visualized by Cytoscape 2.5. 100 nodes.

The Watts–Strogatz model is a random graph generation model that produces graphs with small-world properties, including short average path lengths and high clustering. It was proposed by Duncan J. Watts and Steven Strogatz in their article published in 1998 in the Nature scientific journal. The model also became known as the (Watts) beta model after Watts used $\beta$ to formulate it in his popular science book Six Degrees.

== Rationale for the model ==
The formal study of random graphs dates back to the work of Paul Erdős and Alfréd Rényi. The graphs they considered, now known as the classical or Erdős–Rényi (ER) graphs, offer a simple and powerful model with many applications.

However the ER graphs do not have two important properties observed in many real-world networks:

1. They do not generate local clustering and triadic closures. Instead, because they have a constant, random, and independent probability of two nodes being connected, ER graphs have a low clustering coefficient.
2. They do not account for the formation of hubs. Formally, the degree distribution of ER graphs converges to a Poisson distribution, rather than a power law observed in many real-world, scale-free networks.

The Watts and Strogatz model was designed as the simplest possible model that addresses the first of the two limitations. It accounts for clustering while retaining the short average path lengths of the ER model. It does so by interpolating between a randomized structure close to ER graphs and a regular ring lattice. Consequently, the model is able to at least partially explain the "small-world" phenomena in a variety of networks, such as the power grid, neural network of C. elegans, networks of movie actors, or fat-metabolism communication in budding yeast.

== Algorithm ==
Watts–Strogatz graph

Given the desired number of nodes $N$, the mean degree $K$ (assumed to be an even integer), and a parameter $\beta$, all satisfying $0 \le \beta \le 1$ and $N\gg K \gg \ln N \gg 1$, the model constructs an undirected graph with $N$ nodes and $\frac{NK}{2}$ edges in the following way:

1. Construct a regular ring lattice, a graph with $N$ nodes each connected to $K$ neighbors, $K/2$ on each side. That is, if the nodes are labeled $0 \ldots {N-1},$ there is an edge $(i, j)$ if and only if $0 < |i - j|\ \mathrm{mod}\ \left( N-1-\frac K 2 \right) \leq \frac K 2.$
2. For every node $i=0,\dots, {N-1}$ take every edge connecting $i$ to its $K/2$ rightmost neighbors, that is every edge $(i, j)$ such that $0 < (j-i) \ \mathrm{mod}\ N \leq K/2$, and rewire it with probability $\beta$. Rewiring is done by replacing $(i, j)$ with $(i, k)$ where $k$ is chosen uniformly at random from all possible nodes while avoiding self-loops ($k \ne i$) and link duplication (there is no edge $(i, {k'})$ with $k' = k$ at this point in the algorithm).

== Properties ==
The underlying lattice structure of the model produces a locally clustered network, while the randomly rewired links dramatically reduce the average path lengths. The algorithm introduces about $\beta\frac{NK}{2}$ of such non-lattice edges. Varying $\beta$ makes it possible to interpolate between a regular lattice ($\beta=0$) and a structure close to an Erdős–Rényi random graph $G(N, p)$ with $p = \frac{K}{N-1}$ at $\beta=1$. It does not approach the actual ER model since every node will be connected to at least $K / 2$ other nodes.

The three properties of interest are the average path length, the clustering coefficient, and the degree distribution.

=== Average path length ===
For a ring lattice, the average path length is $\ell(0)\approx N/2K\gg 1$ and scales linearly with the system size. In the limiting case of $\beta \rightarrow 1$, the graph approaches a random graph with $\ell(1)\approx\frac{\ln N}{\ln K}$, while not actually converging to it. In the intermediate region $0<\beta<1$, the average path length falls very rapidly with increasing $\beta$, quickly approaching its limiting value.

=== Clustering coefficient ===
For the ring lattice the clustering coefficient $C(0)=\frac{3(K-2)}{4(K-1)}$, and so tends to $3/4$ as $K$ grows, independently of the system size. In the limiting case of $\beta \rightarrow 1$ the clustering coefficient is of the same order as the clustering coefficient for classical random graphs, $C=K/(N-1)$ and is thus inversely proportional to the system size. In the intermediate region the clustering coefficient remains quite close to its value for the regular lattice, and only falls at relatively high $\beta$. This results in a region where the average path length falls rapidly, but the clustering coefficient does not, explaining the "small-world" phenomenon.

If we use the Barrat and Weigt measure for clustering $C'(\beta)$ defined as the fraction between the average number of edges between the neighbors of a node and the average number of possible edges between these neighbors, or, alternatively,

$$C'(\beta)\equiv\frac{3\times \text{number of triangles}}{\text{number of connected triples}}$$

then we get $C'(\beta)\sim C(0)(1-\beta)^3.$

=== Degree distribution ===
The degree distribution in the case of the ring lattice is just a Dirac delta function centered at $K$. The degree distribution for a large number of nodes and $0<\beta<1$ can be written as,

$$P(k) \approx \sum_{n=0}^{f(k,K)} {{K/2}\choose{n}} (1-\beta)^n \beta^{K/2-n} \frac{(\beta K/2)^{k-K/2-n}}{(k-K/2-n)!} e^{-\beta K/2},$$

where $k_i$ is the number of edges that the $i^\text{th}$ node has or its degree. Here $k\geq K/2$, and $f(k,K)=\min(k-K/2,K/2)$. The shape of the degree distribution is similar to that of a random graph and has a pronounced peak at $k=K$ and decays exponentially for large $|k-K|$. The topology of the network is relatively homogeneous, meaning that all nodes are of similar degree.

== Limitations ==
The major limitation of the model is that it produces an unrealistic degree distribution. In contrast, real networks are often scale-free networks inhomogeneous in degree, having hubs and a scale-free degree distribution. Such networks are better described in that respect by the preferential attachment family of models, such as the Barabási–Albert (BA) model. (On the other hand, the Barabási–Albert model fails to produce the high levels of clustering seen in real networks, a shortcoming not shared by the Watts and Strogatz model. Thus, neither the Watts and Strogatz model nor the Barabási–Albert model should be viewed as fully realistic.)

The Watts and Strogatz model also implies a fixed number of nodes and thus cannot be used to model network growth.

== See also ==
- Small-world networks
- Erdős–Rényi (ER) model
- Barabási–Albert model
- Social networks
