= Small-world network =

Graph where most nodes are reachable in a small number of steps

Small-world network example
Hubs are bigger than other nodes

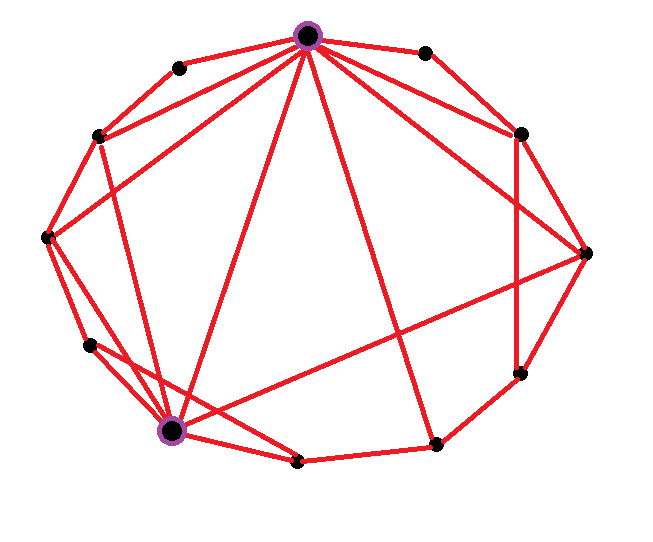
Average degree= 3.833
Average shortest path length = 1.803.
Clustering coefficient = 0.522

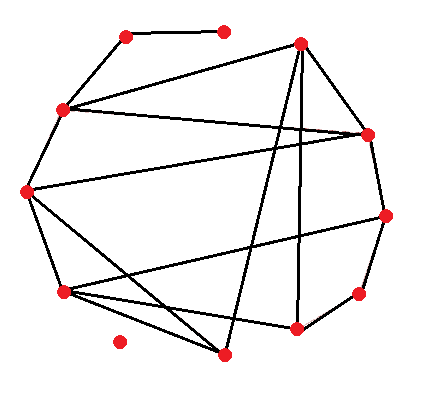
Random graph
Average degree = 2.833
Average shortest path length = 2.109.
Clustering coefficient = 0.167

A small-world network is a graph characterized by a high clustering coefficient and low distances. In an example of a social network, high clustering implies the high probability that two friends of one person are friends themselves. The low distances, on the other hand, mean that there is a short chain of social connections between any two people (this effect is known as six degrees of separation). Specifically, a small-world network is defined to be a network where the typical distance L between two randomly chosen nodes (the number of steps required) grows proportionally to the logarithm of the number of nodes N in the network, that is:

$$L \propto \log N$$

while the global clustering coefficient is not small.

In the context of a social network, this results in the small world phenomenon of strangers being linked by a short chain of acquaintances. Many empirical graphs show the small-world effect, including social networks, wikis such as Wikipedia, gene networks, and even the underlying architecture of the Internet. It is the inspiration for many network-on-chip architectures in contemporary computer hardware.

A certain category of small-world networks were identified as a class of random graphs by Duncan Watts and Steven Strogatz in 1998. They noted that graphs could be classified according to two independent structural features, namely the clustering coefficient, and average node-to-node distance (also known as average shortest path length). Purely random graphs, built according to the Erdős–Rényi (ER) model, exhibit a small average shortest path length (varying typically as the logarithm of the number of nodes) along with a small clustering coefficient. Watts and Strogatz measured that in fact many real-world networks have a small average shortest path length, but also a clustering coefficient significantly higher than expected by random chance. Watts and Strogatz then proposed a novel graph model, currently named the Watts and Strogatz model, with (i) a small average shortest path length, and (ii) a large clustering coefficient. The crossover in the Watts–Strogatz model between a "large world" (such as a lattice) and a small world was first described by Barthelemy and Amaral in 1999. This work was followed by many studies, including exact results (Barrat and Weigt, 1999; Dorogovtsev and Mendes; Barmpoutis and Murray, 2010).

== Properties of small-world networks ==
Small-world networks tend to contain cliques, and near-cliques, meaning sub-networks which have connections between almost any two nodes within them. This follows from the defining property of a high clustering coefficient. Secondly, most pairs of nodes will be connected by at least one short path. This follows from the defining property that the mean-shortest path length be small. Several other properties are often associated with small-world networks. Typically there is an over-abundance of hubs – nodes in the network with a high number of connections (known as high degree nodes). These hubs serve as the common connections mediating the short path lengths between other edges. By analogy, the small-world network of airline flights has a small mean-path length (i.e. between any two cities you are likely to have to take three or fewer flights) because many flights are routed through hub cities. This property is often analyzed by considering the fraction of nodes in the network that have a particular number of connections going into them (the degree distribution of the network). Networks with a greater than expected number of hubs will have a greater fraction of nodes with high degree, and consequently the degree distribution will be enriched at high degree values. This is known colloquially as a fat-tailed distribution. Graphs of very different topology qualify as small-world networks as long as they satisfy the two definitional requirements above.

Network small-worldness has been quantified by a small-coefficient, $\sigma$, calculated by comparing clustering and path length of a given network to an Erdős–Rényi model with same degree on average.

$$\sigma = \frac \frac C {C_r} \frac L {L_r}$$
if $\sigma > 1$ ($C \gg C_r$ and $L \approx {L_r}$), network is small-world. However, this metric is known to perform poorly because it is heavily influenced by the network's size.

Another method for quantifying network small-worldness utilizes the original definition of the small-world network comparing the clustering of a given network to an equivalent lattice network and its path length to an equivalent random network. The small-world measure ($\omega$) is defined as

$$\omega = \frac{L_r} L - \frac C {C_\ell}$$

Where the characteristic path length L and clustering coefficient C are calculated from the network you are testing, C_{ℓ} is the clustering coefficient for an equivalent lattice network and L_{r} is the characteristic path length for an equivalent random network.

Still another method for quantifying small-worldness normalizes both the network's clustering and path length relative to these characteristics in equivalent lattice and random networks. The Small World Index (SWI) is defined as

$$\text{SWI} = \frac{L-L_\ell}{L_r-L_\ell}\times\frac{C-C_r}{C_\ell-C_r}$$

Both ω′ and SWI range between 0 and 1, and have been shown to capture aspects of small-worldness. However, they adopt slightly different conceptions of ideal small-worldness. For a given set of constraints (e.g. size, density, degree distribution), there exists a network for which ω′ = 1, and thus ω aims to capture the extent to which a network with given constraints as small worldly as possible. In contrast, there may not exist a network for which SWI = 1, thus SWI aims to capture the extent to which a network with given constraints approaches the theoretical small world ideal of a network where C ≈ C_{ℓ} and L ≈ L_{r}.

== Examples of small-world networks ==
Small-world properties are found in many real-world phenomena, including websites with navigation menus, food webs, electric power grids, metabolite processing networks, networks of brain neurons, voter networks, telephone call graphs, and airport networks. Cultural networks and word co-occurrence networks have also been shown to be small-world networks.

Networks of connected proteins have small world properties such as power-law obeying degree distributions. Similarly transcriptional networks, in which the nodes are genes, and they are linked if one gene has an up or down-regulatory genetic influence on the other, have small world network properties.

== Examples of non-small-world networks ==
In another example, the famous theory of "six degrees of separation" between people tacitly presumes that the domain of discourse is the set of people alive at any one time. The number of degrees of separation between Albert Einstein and Alexander the Great is almost certainly greater than 30 and this network does not have small-world properties. A similarly constrained network would be the "went to school with" network: if two people went to the same college ten years apart from one another, it is unlikely that they have acquaintances in common amongst the student body.

Similarly, the number of relay stations through which a message must pass was not always small. In the days when the post was carried by hand or on horseback, the number of times a letter changed hands between its source and destination would have been much greater than it is today. The number of times a message changed hands in the days of the visual telegraph (circa 1800–1850) was determined by the requirement that two stations be connected by line-of-sight.

Tacit assumptions, if not examined, can cause a bias in the literature on graphs in favor of finding small-world networks (an example of the file drawer effect resulting from the publication bias).

== Network robustness ==
It is hypothesized by some researchers, such as Albert-László Barabási, that the prevalence of small world networks in biological systems may reflect an evolutionary advantage of such an architecture. One possibility is that small-world networks are more robust to perturbations than other network architectures. If this were the case, it would provide an advantage to biological systems that are subject to damage by mutation or viral infection.

In a small world network with a degree distribution following a power-law, deletion of a random node rarely causes a dramatic increase in mean-shortest path length (or a dramatic decrease in the clustering coefficient). This follows from the fact that most shortest paths between nodes flow through hubs, and if a peripheral node is deleted it is unlikely to interfere with passage between other peripheral nodes. As the fraction of peripheral nodes in a small world network is much higher than the fraction of hubs, the probability of deleting an important node is very low. For example, if the small airport in Sun Valley, Idaho was shut down, it would not increase the average number of flights that other passengers traveling in the United States would have to take to arrive at their respective destinations. However, if random deletion of a node hits a hub by chance, the average path length can increase dramatically. This can be observed annually when northern hub airports, such as Chicago's O'Hare airport, are shut down because of snow; many people have to take additional flights.

By contrast, in a random network, in which all nodes have roughly the same number of connections, deleting a random node is likely to increase the mean-shortest path length slightly but significantly for almost any node deleted. In this sense, random networks are vulnerable to random perturbations, whereas small-world networks are robust. However, small-world networks are vulnerable to targeted attack of hubs, whereas random networks cannot be targeted for catastrophic failure.

== Construction of small-world networks ==
The main mechanism to construct small-world networks is the Watts–Strogatz mechanism.

Small-world networks can also be introduced with time-delay, which will not only produce fractals but also chaos under the right conditions, or transition to chaos in dynamics networks.

Soon after the publication of Watts–Strogatz mechanism, approaches have been developed by Mashaghi and co-workers to generate network models that exhibit high degree correlations, while preserving the desired degree distribution and small-world properties. These approaches are based on edge-dual transformation and can be used to generate analytically solvable small-world network models for research into these systems.

Degree–diameter graphs are constructed such that the number of neighbors each vertex in the network has is bounded, while the distance from any given vertex in the network to any other vertex (the diameter of the network) is minimized. Constructing such small-world networks is done as part of the effort to find graphs of order close to the Moore bound.

Another way to construct a small world network from scratch is given in Barmpoutis et al., where a network with very small average distance and very large average clustering is constructed. A fast algorithm of constant complexity is given, along with measurements of the robustness of the resulting graphs. Depending on the application of each network, one can start with one such "ultra small-world" network, and then rewire some edges, or use several small such networks as subgraphs to a larger graph.

Small-world properties can arise naturally in social networks and other real-world systems via the process of dual-phase evolution. This is particularly common where time or spatial constraints limit the addition of connections between vertices The mechanism generally involves periodic shifts between phases, with connections being added during a "global" phase and being reinforced or removed during a "local" phase.

Small-world networks can change from scale-free class to broad-scale class whose connectivity distribution has a sharp cutoff following a power law regime due to constraints limiting the addition of new links. For strong enough constraints, scale-free networks can even become single-scale networks whose connectivity distribution is characterized as fast decaying. It was also shown analytically that scale-free networks are ultra-small, meaning that the distance scales according to $L \propto \log \log N$.

== Applications ==
=== Applications to sociology ===
The advantages to small world networking for social movement groups are their resistance to change due to the filtering apparatus of using highly connected nodes, and its better effectiveness in relaying information while keeping the number of links required to connect a network to a minimum.

The small world network model is directly applicable to affinity group theory represented in sociological arguments by William Finnegan. Affinity groups are social movement groups that are small and semi-independent pledged to a larger goal or function. Though largely unaffiliated at the node level, a few members of high connectivity function as connectivity nodes, linking the different groups through networking. This small world model has proven an extremely effective protest organization tactic against police action. Clay Shirky argues that the larger the social network created through small world networking, the more valuable the nodes of high connectivity within the network. The same can be said for the affinity group model, where the few people within each group connected to outside groups allowed for a large amount of mobilization and adaptation. A practical example of this is small world networking through affinity groups that William Finnegan outlines in reference to the 1999 Seattle WTO protests.

=== Applications to earth sciences ===
Many networks studied in geology and geophysics have been shown to have characteristics of small-world networks. Networks defined in fracture systems and porous substances have demonstrated these characteristics. The seismic network in the Southern California region may be a small-world network. The examples above occur on very different spatial scales, demonstrating the scale invariance of the phenomenon in the earth sciences.

=== Applications to computing ===
Small-world networks have been used to estimate the usability of information stored in large databases. The measure is termed the Small World Data Transformation Measure. The greater the database links align to a small-world network the more likely a user is going to be able to extract information in the future. This usability typically comes at the cost of the amount of information that can be stored in the same repository.

The Freenet peer-to-peer network has been shown to form a small-world network in simulation, allowing information to be stored and retrieved in a manner that scales efficiency as the network grows.

Nearest Neighbor Search solutions like HNSW use small-world networks to efficiently find the information in large item corpuses.

=== Small-world neural networks in the brain ===
Both anatomical connections in the brain and the synchronization networks of cortical neurons exhibit small-world topology.

Structural and functional connectivity in the brain has also been found to reflect the small-world topology of short path length and high clustering. The network structure has been found in the mammalian cortex across species as well as in large scale imaging studies in humans. Advances in connectomics and network neuroscience, have found the small-worldness of neural networks to be associated with efficient communication.

In neural networks, short pathlength between nodes and high clustering at network hubs supports efficient communication between brain regions at the lowest energetic cost. The brain is constantly processing and adapting to new information and small-world network model supports the intense communication demands of neural networks. High clustering of nodes forms local networks which are often functionally related. Short path length between these hubs supports efficient global communication. This balance enables the efficiency of the global network while simultaneously equipping the brain to handle disruptions and maintain homeostasis, due to local subsystems being isolated from the global network. Loss of small-world network structure has been found to indicate changes in cognition and increased risk of psychological disorders.

In addition to characterizing whole-brain functional and structural connectivity, specific neural systems, such as the visual system, exhibit small-world network properties.

A small-world network of neurons can exhibit short-term memory. A computer model developed by Sara Solla had two stable states, a property (called bistability) thought to be important in memory storage. An activating pulse generated self-sustaining loops of communication activity among the neurons. A second pulse ended this activity. The pulses switched the system between stable states: flow (recording a "memory"), and stasis (holding it). Small world neuronal networks have also been used as models to understand seizures.

== See also ==
- Barabási–Albert model – Scale-free network generation algorithm
- Climate as complex networks – Conceptual model to generate insight into climate science
- Dual-phase evolution – Process that drives self-organization within complex adaptive systems
- Dunbar's number – Suggested cognitive limit important in sociology and anthropology
- Erdős number – Degrees of separation from Paul Erdős
- Erdős–Rényi (ER) model – Two closely related models for generating random graphs
- Local World Evolving Network Models
- Percolation theory – Mathematical theory on behavior of connected clusters in a random graph
- Network science – Academic field - mathematical theory of networks
- Scale-free network – Network whose degree distribution follows a power law
- Six degrees of Kevin Bacon – Parlor game on degrees of separation
- Small-world experiment – Experiments examining the average path length for social networks
- Social network – Social structure made up of a set of social actors
- Watts–Strogatz model – Method of generating random small-world graphs
- Network on a chip – Electronic communication subsystem on an integrated circuit – systems on chip modeled on small-world networks
- Zachary's karate club
