= Steven Strogatz =

American mathematician (born 1959)

Steven H. Strogatz
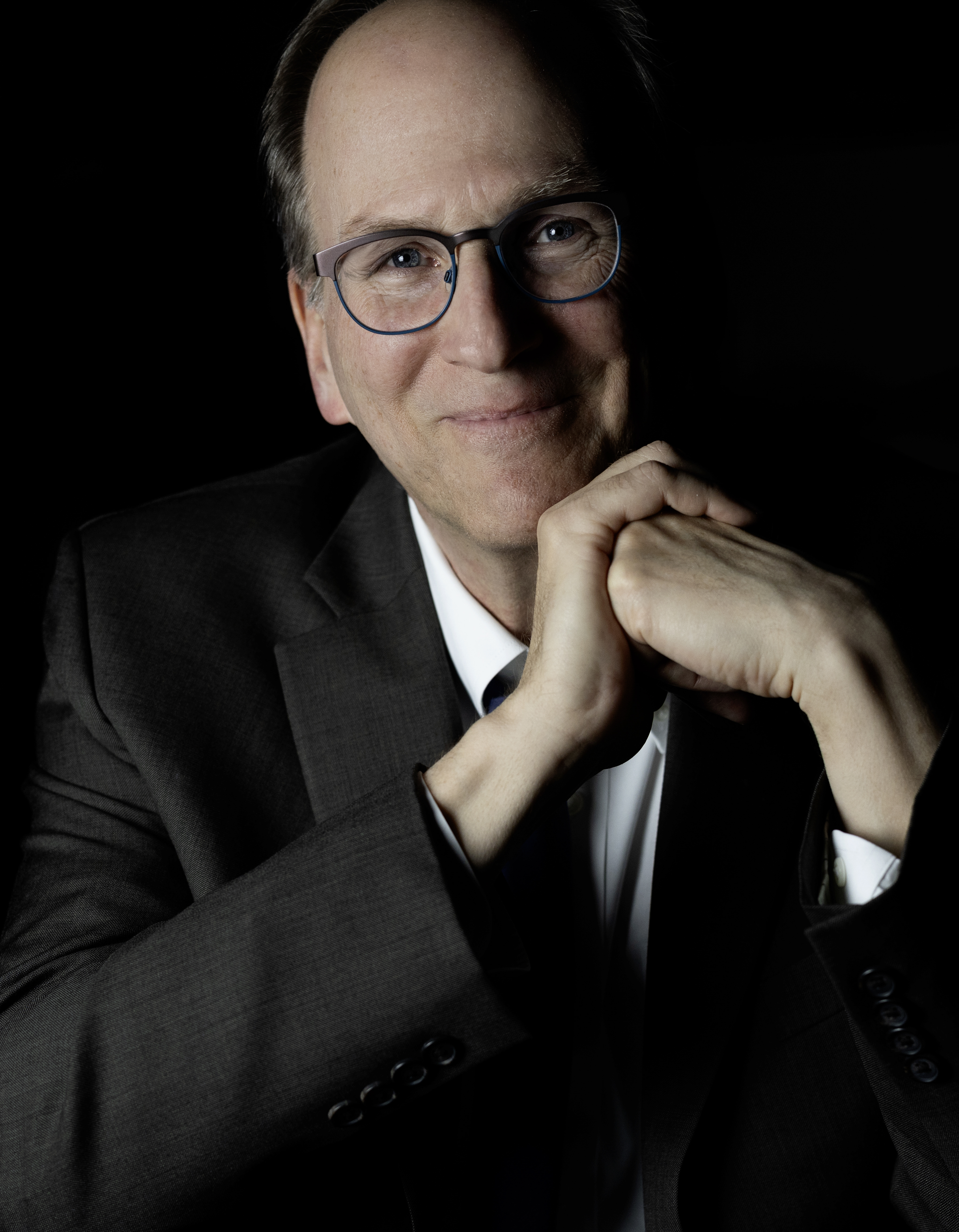
- Steven H. Strogatz in 2025
- Born: August 13, 1959 (age 67); Torrington, Connecticut, U.S.
- Education: Princeton University (BA); Trinity College, Cambridge; Harvard University (PhD)
- Known for: Watts–Strogatz model
- Spouse: Carole Schiffman
- Children: Leah Strogatz, Joanna Strogatz
- Awards: Member of the National Academy of Sciences; Fellow of the American Academy of Arts and Sciences; Lewis Thomas Prize
- Scientific career
- Fields: Mathematics; Complex systems Networks; Applied mathematics Chaos theory
- Workplaces: Massachusetts Institute of Technology; Cornell University; University of Cambridge; Princeton University; Harvard University; Boston University
- Thesis: The Mathematical Structure of the Human Sleep-Wake Cycle (1986)
- Doctoral advisor: Richard Ernest Kronauer; Charles Czeisler
- Doctoral students: Duncan J. Watts; Lauren M. Childs
- Website: www.stevenstrogatz.com math.cornell.edu/steven-strogatz

Steven Henry Strogatz (/ˈstroʊɡæts/; born August 13, 1959) is an American mathematician and author, and the Susan and Barton Winokur distinguished professor for the public understanding of science and mathematics at Cornell University. He is known for his work on nonlinear systems, including contributions to the study of synchronization in dynamical systems, and his research in a variety of areas of applied mathematics, including mathematical biology and complex network theory. With Duncan Watts, he developed the Watts–Strogatz model to explain how nodes in a small-world network have in average a small number of degrees of separation.

Strogatz is the co-host of Quanta Magazine's The Joy of Why podcast. He previously hosted The Joy of x podcast. His published books include Nonlinear Dynamics and Chaos, Sync, The Joy of x, The Calculus of Friendship, and Infinite Powers.

== Education ==
Strogatz attended high school at Loomis Chaffee from 1972 to 1976. He then attended Princeton University, graduating summa cum laude with a B.A. in mathematics. Strogatz completed his senior thesis, titled "The Mathematics of Supercoiled DNA: An Essay in Geometric Biology", under the supervision of Frederick J. Almgren, Jr. Strogatz then studied as a Marshall Scholar at Trinity College, Cambridge, from 1980 to 1982. He received a Ph.D. in applied mathematics from Harvard University in 1986 for his research on the dynamics of the human sleep-wake cycle. He completed his postdoc under Nancy Kopell at Boston University.

== Career ==
After spending three years as a National Science Foundation postdoctoral fellow at Harvard and Boston University, Strogatz joined the faculty of the department of mathematics at MIT in 1989. His research on dynamical systems was recognized with a Presidential Young Investigator Award from the National Science Foundation in 1990. In 1994 he moved to Cornell where he is a professor of mathematics. From 2007 to 2023 he was the Jacob Gould Schurman professor of applied mathematics, and in 2023 he was named the inaugural holder of the Susan and Barton Winokur distinguished professorship for the public understanding of science and mathematics. From 2004 to 2010, he was also on the external faculty of the Santa Fe Institute.

== Research ==
Early in his career, Strogatz worked on a variety of problems in mathematical biology, including the geometry of supercoiled DNA, the topology of three-dimensional chemical waves, and the collective behavior of biological oscillators, such as swarms of synchronously flashing fireflies. In the 1990s, his work focused on nonlinear dynamics and chaos applied to physics, engineering, and biology. Several of these projects dealt with coupled oscillators, such as lasers, superconducting Josephson junctions, and crickets that chirp in unison. His more recent work examines complex systems and their consequences in everyday life, such as the role of crowd synchronization in the wobbling of London's Millennium Bridge on its opening day, and the dynamics of structural balance in social systems.

Perhaps his best-known research contribution is his 1998 Nature paper with Duncan Watts, entitled "Collective dynamics of small-world networks". This paper is widely regarded as a foundational contribution to the interdisciplinary field of complex networks, whose applications range from graph theory and statistical physics to sociology, business, epidemiology, and neuroscience. As one measure of its importance, it was the most highly cited article about networks between 1998 and 2008, and the sixth most highly cited paper in all of physics. It has now been cited more than 60,000 times, according to Google Scholar; as of 17 October 2014, it was the 63rd most highly cited research article of all time.

== Writing and outreach ==
Strogatz's writing for the general public includes four books and frequent newspaper articles. His book Sync was chosen as the Best Book of 2003 by Discover Magazine. His 2009 book The Calculus of Friendship was called "a genuine tearjerker" and "part biography, part autobiography and part off-the-beaten-path guide to calculus." His 2012 book, The Joy of x, won the 2014 Euler Book Prize. Strogatz's most recent book, Infinite Powers, was shortlisted for the Royal Society Insight Investment Science Book Prize and was a New York Times Best Seller. Published in 2019, it "evocatively conveys how calculus illuminates the patterns of the Universe, large and small," according to a review in Nature.

Strogatz has written three series of New York Times columns on mathematics. His 2010 series, "The Elements of Math" was described by Harvard Business Review as "a model for how mathematics needs to be popularized" and as a "must read for entrepreneurs and executives who grasp that mathematics is now the lingua franca of serious business analysis." Strogatz's second New York Times series, "Me, Myself and Math", appeared in the fall of 2012. His most recent New York Times series, "Math, Revealed", appeared in June 2025.

== Awards ==
Strogatz is a member of the National Academy of Sciences and a fellow of the Society for Industrial and Applied Mathematics, the American Academy of Arts and Sciences, the American Physical Society, and the American Mathematical Society.

Strogatz has been lauded for his ability as a teacher and communicator. In 1991 he was honored with the E. M. Baker Memorial Award for Excellence in Undergraduate Teaching, MIT's only institute-wide teaching award selected and awarded solely by students. He has also won several teaching awards at Cornell, including Cornell's highest undergraduate teaching prize, the Stephen H. Weiss Presidential Fellowship (2016). At the national level, Strogatz received the JPBM Communications Award in 2007. Presented annually, this award recognizes outstanding achievement in communicating about mathematics to nonmathematicians. The JPBM represents the American Mathematical Society, the American Statistical Association, the Mathematical Association of America, and the Society for Industrial and Applied Mathematics. In 2013 he received the AAAS Public Engagement with Science Award for "his exceptional commitment to and passion for conveying the beauty and importance of mathematics to the general public."

Strogatz was selected to be the 2009 Rouse Ball lecturer at Cambridge and an MIT Mathematics 2011 Simons lecturer.

In 2014 he was awarded the Euler Book Prize by The Mathematical Association of America for "The Joy of x". The award citation describes the book as "a masterpiece of expository writing" and remarks that it is "directed to the millions of readers who claim they never really understood what the mathematics they studied was all about, for whom math was a series of techniques to be mastered for no apparent reason." Along with Ian Stewart, Strogatz was awarded the 2015 Lewis Thomas Prize for Writing about Science.
