= Clustering coefficient =

Measure of how connected and clustered a node is in its graph

In graph theory, a clustering coefficient is a measure of the degree to which nodes in a graph tend to cluster together. Evidence suggests that in most real-world networks, and in particular social networks, nodes tend to create tightly knit groups characterised by a relatively high density of ties; this likelihood tends to be greater than the average probability of a tie randomly established between two nodes (Holland and Leinhardt, 1971; Watts and Strogatz, 1998).

Two versions of this measure exist: the global and the local. The global version was designed to give an overall indication of the clustering in the network, whereas the local gives an indication of the extent of "clustering" of a single node.

== Local clustering coefficient ==
Example local clustering coefficient on an undirected graph. The local clustering coefficient of the blue node is computed as the proportion of connections among its neighbours which are actually realised compared with the number of all possible connections. In the figure, the blue node has three neighbours, which can have a maximum of 3 connections among them. In the top part of the figure all three possible connections are realised (thick black segments), giving a local clustering coefficient of 1. In the middle part of the figure only one connection is realised (thick black line) and 2 connections are missing (dotted red lines), giving a local cluster coefficient of 1/3. Finally, none of the possible connections among the neighbours of the blue node are realised, producing a local clustering coefficient value of 0.

The local clustering coefficient of a vertex (node) in a graph quantifies how close its neighbours are to being a clique (complete graph). Duncan J. Watts and Steven Strogatz introduced the measure in 1998 to determine whether a graph is a small-world network.

A graph $G=(V,E)$ formally consists of a set of vertices $V$ and a set of edges $E$ between them. An edge $e_{ij}$ connects vertex $v_i$ with vertex $v_j$.

The neighborhood $N_i$ for a vertex $v_i$ is defined as its immediately connected neighbours as follows:

$$N_i = \{v_j : e_{ij} \in E \lor e_{ji} \in E\}.$$

We define $k_i$ as $|N_i|$, the number of vertices in $N_i$, the neighbourhood of vertex $v_i$.

The local clustering coefficient $C_i$ for a vertex $v_i$ is then given by a proportion of the number of links between the vertices within its neighbourhood divided by the number of links that could possibly exist between them. For a directed graph, $e_{ij}$ is distinct from $e_{ji}$, and therefore for each neighbourhood $N_i$ there are $k_i(k_i-1)$ links that could exist among the vertices within the neighbourhood ($k_i$ is the number of neighbours of a vertex). Thus, the local clustering coefficient for directed graphs is given as

$$C_i = \frac{|\{e_{jk}: v_j,v_k \in N_i, e_{jk} \in E\}|}{k_i(k_i-1)}.$$

An undirected graph has the property that $e_{ij}$ and $e_{ji}$ are considered identical. Therefore, if a vertex $v_i$ has $k_i$ neighbours, $\frac{k_i(k_i-1)}{2}$ edges could exist among the vertices within the neighbourhood. Thus, the local clustering coefficient for undirected graphs can be defined as

$$C_i = \frac{2|\{e_{jk}: v_j,v_k \in N_i, e_{jk} \in E\}|}{k_i(k_i-1)}.$$

Let $\lambda_G(v)$ be the number of triangles on $v \in V(G)$ for undirected graph $G$. That is, $\lambda_G(v)$ is the number of subgraphs of $G$ with 3 edges and 3 vertices, one of which is $v$. Let $\tau_G(v)$ be the number of triples on $v \in G$. That is, $\tau_G(v)$ is the number of subgraphs (not necessarily induced) with 2 edges and 3 vertices, one of which is $v$ and such that $v$ is incident to both edges. Then we can also define the clustering coefficient as

$$C_i = \frac{\lambda_G(v)}{\tau_G(v)}.$$

It is simple to show that the two preceding definitions are the same, since

$$\tau_G(v) = C({k_i},2) = \frac{1}{2}k_i(k_i-1).$$

These measures are 1 if every neighbour connected to $v_i$ is also connected to every other vertex within the neighbourhood, and 0 if no vertex that is connected to $v_i$ connects to any other vertex that is connected to $v_i$.

Since any graph is fully specified by its adjacency matrix A, the local clustering coefficient for a simple undirected graph can be expressed in terms of A as:

$$C_i=\frac{1}{k_i(k_i-1)}\sum_{j,k} A_{ij}A_{jk}A_{ki}$$

where:

$$k_i=\sum_j A_{ij}$$

and C_{i}=0 when k_{i} is zero or one. In the above expression, the numerator counts twice the number of complete triangles that vertex i is involved in. In the denominator, k_{i}^{2} counts the number of edge pairs that vertex i is involved in plus the number of single edges traversed twice. k_{i} is the number of edges connected to vertex i, and subtracting k_{i} then removes the latter, leaving only a set of edge pairs that could conceivably be connected into triangles. For every such edge pair, there will be another edge pair which could form the same triangle, so the denominator counts twice the number of conceivable triangles that vertex i could be involved in.

== Global clustering coefficient ==
The global clustering coefficient is based on triplets of nodes. A triplet is three nodes that are connected by either two (open triplet) or three (closed triplet) undirected ties. A triangle graph therefore includes three closed triplets, one centred on each of the nodes (n.b. this means the three triplets in a triangle come from overlapping selections of nodes). The global clustering coefficient is the number of closed triplets (or 3 x triangles) over the total number of triplets (both open and closed). The first attempt to measure it was made by Luce and Perry (1949). This measure gives an indication of the clustering in the whole network (global), and can be applied to both undirected and directed networks (often called transitivity, see Wasserman and Faust, 1994, page 243).

The global clustering coefficient is defined as:

$$C = \frac{\mbox{number of closed triplets}}{\mbox{number of all triplets (open and closed)}}$$.

The number of closed triplets has also been referred to as 3 × triangles in the literature, so:

$$C = \frac{3 \times \mbox{number of triangles}}{\mbox{number of all triplets}}$$.

A generalisation to weighted networks was proposed by Opsahl and Panzarasa (2009), and a redefinition to two-mode networks (both binary and weighted) by Opsahl (2009).

Since any simple graph is fully specified by its adjacency matrix A, the global clustering coefficient for an undirected graph can be expressed in terms of A as:

$$C=\frac{\sum_{i,j,k} A_{ij}A_{jk}A_{ki}}{\frac{1}{2}\sum_i k_i(k_i-1)}$$

where:

$$k_i=\sum_j A_{ij}$$

and C=0 when the denominator is zero.

=== Network average clustering coefficient ===
As an alternative to the global clustering coefficient, the overall level of clustering in a network is measured by Watts and Strogatz as the average of the local clustering coefficients of all the vertices $n$ :

$$\bar{C} = \frac{1}{n}\sum_{i=1}^{n} C_i.$$

This metric places more weight on the low degree nodes, while the transitivity ratio places more weight on the high degree nodes.

A generalisation to weighted networks was proposed by Barrat et al. (2004), and a redefinition to bipartite graphs (also called two-mode networks) by Latapy et al. (2008) and Opsahl (2009).

Alternative generalisations to weighted and directed graphs have been provided by Fagiolo (2007) and Clemente and Grassi (2018).

This formula is not, by default, defined for graphs with isolated vertices; see Kaiser (2008) and Barmpoutis et al. The networks with the largest possible average clustering coefficient are found to have a modular structure, and at the same time, they have the smallest possible average distance among the different nodes.

== Percolation of clustered networks ==
For a random tree-like network without degree-degree correlation, it can be shown that such network can have a giant component, and the percolation threshold (transmission probability) is given by $p_c = \frac{1}{g_1'(1)}$, where $g_1(z)$ is the generating function corresponding to the excess degree distribution.

In networks with low clustering, $0 < C \ll 1$, the critical point gets scaled by $(1-C)^{-1}$ such that:

$p_c = \frac{1}{1-C}\frac{1}{g_1'(1)}.$

This indicates that for a given degree distribution, the clustering leads to a larger percolation threshold, mainly because for a fixed number of links, the clustering structure reinforces the core of the network with the price of diluting the global connections. For networks with high clustering, strong clustering could induce the core–periphery structure, in which the core and periphery might percolate at different critical points, and the above approximate treatment is not applicable.

For studying the robustness of clustered networks a percolation approach is developed.

== See also ==
- Directed graph
- Graph theory
- Network theory
- Network science
- Percolation theory
- Scale free network
- Small world
