= Infoblox =

American technology company

Infoblox, Inc.
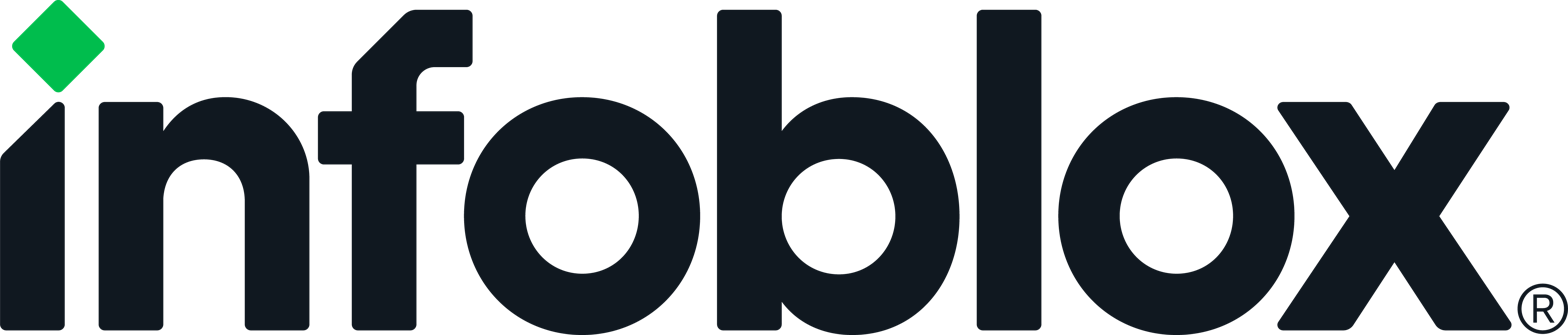
- Type: Private
- Traded as: NYSE: BLOX (2012–2016)
- Industry: Computer networking, cybersecurity, IT automation
- Founded: 1999; 27 years ago in Chicago, Illinois, U.S.
- Founder: Stuart Bailey
- Headquarters: Santa Clara, California, U.S.
- Key people: Scott Harrell (President & CEO)
- Products: Universal DDI Product Suite, NIOS (Network Identity Operating System), Infoblox Threat Defense
- Owners: Vista Equity Partners; Warburg Pincus
- Number of employees: 2600+ (2025)
- Website: www.infoblox.com

Infoblox, is a privately held IT automation and cybersecurity company based in California's Silicon Valley. Its products are used to manage core network services, including the Domain Name System (DNS), Dynamic Host Configuration Protocol (DHCP), and IP address management, collectively known as DDI.

The company was founded in 1999 and went public in 2012 before being acquired by Vista Equity Partners in 2016.

== History ==
Infoblox was co-founded in 1999 in Chicago, Illinois, by Stuart Bailey, Michael Ford, Greg Lanier, Tom Kowal, and Ivan Pulleyn.

In 2005, Infoblox launched SilverBox, an early nonstop DNS and DHCP appliance solution.

In 2007, Infoblox acquired French startup lpanto, which led to the development of IPAM Win Connect appliances. In 2010, Infoblox acquired Net Cordia which provided technologies for network task automation. Later in the same year, the company integrated Infoblox IP address management technology with Net Cordia's network configuration and change management technologies.

In 2012, Infoblox completed its initial public offering on the New York Stock Exchange, trading under the symbol BLOX.

In 2013, Infoblox released Tapestry, an open source tool designed to run on OpenFlow devices that collects data on network complexity. The tool was developed by Stu Bailey (Infoblox CTO at the time) and Professor Robert Grossman of the University of Chicago.

In February 2016, the company acquired IID, a cyber threat intelligence provider for $45 million. On September 19, 2016, Vista Equity Partners announced intent to purchase Infoblox for approximately $1.6 billion. The acquisition was finalized in November 2016, and Infoblox was thereby delisted from the NYSE.

In June 2017, Infoblox announced an expansion to its office in Tacoma, Washington, which focuses on cybersecurity research, threat intelligence and engineering.

In 2019 Infoblox acquired SnapRoute and their Cloud-Native Network Operating System (CN-NOS). The acquisition helped complete Infoblox's secure access service edge offerings, breaking into the SASE market. In December 2019, Infoblox was included in the list for the Top 25 Cybersecurity Companies of 2019 by The Software Report.

On September 8, 2020, Infoblox announced a significant investment from Warburg Pincus. After necessary approvals, the investment closed on December 1, 2020, with Vista Equity Partners and Warburg Pincus holding 50% ownership in Infoblox.

On January 11, 2023, Infoblox appointed Scott Harrell as CEO and President.

In 2025, Infoblox launched managed rules for AWS Network Firewall, integrating its DNS-based threat intelligence natively into Amazon Web Services environments to detect and block connections to malicious domains before they impact cloud workloads. The integration automates rule updates and reportedly reduces downstream firewall alerts fivefold, saving organizations an average of 500 SOC analyst hours per month.

In August 2025, the company appointed Joshua Husk as Chief Revenue Officer. Husk had previously held executive positions at Software AG, Oracle, IBM, and Intel.

In September 2025, Infoblox appointed Justin Kappers as Chief Information Officer. Kappers previously held senior IT leadership roles at NetApp, Broadcom, and Deloitte.

In 2026, Infoblox announced a definitive agreement to acquire Axur, an AI-powered external threat detection and disruption company, with the transaction expected to close in Spring 2026. The acquisition aims to combine Axur's AI-driven phishing detection and takedown capabilities with Infoblox's DNS-layer security, reducing malicious infrastructure uptime from days to hours. Financial terms were not disclosed.

== Financial results ==
Infoblox received $80 million in five rounds of financing (2000, 2001, 2003, 2004 and 2005). The company's main investor was Sequoia Capital. The company had their initial public offering on April 20, 2012. Shares were listed on the New York Stock Exchange under the symbol BLOX. The stock price advanced 40 percent in the first day of trading. After adding 250 employees that year, Infoblox moved to Santa Clara. Earnings leading up through Q4 2013 showed financial as well as physical growth. Total net revenue for the fourth quarter of fiscal year 2013 was $63.1 million, an increase of 40 percent on a year-over-year basis. Total net revenue for fiscal 2013 was a record $225.0 million, an increase of 33 percent compared with the total net revenue of $169.2 million in fiscal 2012.

First quarter results for 2014 fell short of expectations, showing a drop share price.

By 2015, the Infoblox market share in DDI jumped to 49.9 percent in 2015 from 46.7 percent in 2014, and the overall DDI market grew 18.3 percent in the same period to $533 million. No other competitor had a market share greater than 15 percent.

As a private company, Infoblox does not publicly disclose detailed financials. However, according to a 2023 report from PitchBook, the company generates over $400 million in annual recurring revenue and serves more than 12,000 customers globally, including 70% of the Fortune 500.

== Threat Research ==
Infoblox produces original cyber threat intelligence by analyzing DNS analytics to uncover previously undocumented threat actors and infrastructure.

- Decoy Dog: a DNS-based command-and-control malware toolkit
- Loopy Lizard (formerly Open Tangle): a phishing campaign utilizing lookalike domains targeting financial and governmental institutions
- Prolific Puma, a URL shortening service for malicious actors
- Muddling Meerkat: a sophisticated DNS operation linked to the manipulation of China's Great Firewall
- Vigorish Viper: a cybercrime syndicate connecting European football sponsorships to illegal gambling and human trafficking activities
