= Robustness of complex networks =

Ability of a complex network to withstand failures and perturbations

Robustness, the ability to withstand failures and perturbations, is a critical attribute of many complex systems including complex networks.

The study of robustness in complex networks is important for many fields. In ecology, robustness is an important attribute of ecosystems, and can give insight into the reaction to disturbances such as the extinction of species. For biologists, network robustness can help the study of diseases and mutations, and how to recover from some mutations. In economics, network robustness principles can help understanding of the stability and risks of banking systems. And in engineering, network robustness can help to evaluate the resilience of infrastructure networks such as the Internet or power grids.

== Percolation theory ==
The focus of robustness in complex networks is the response of the network to the removal of nodes or links. The mathematical model of such a process can be thought of as an inverse percolation process. Percolation theory models the process of randomly placing pebbles on an n-dimensional lattice with probability p, and predicts the sudden formation of a single large cluster at a critical probability $p_c$. In percolation theory this cluster is named the percolating cluster. This phenomenon is quantified in percolation theory by a number of quantities, for example the average cluster size $\langle s \rangle$. This quantity represents the average size of all finite clusters and is given by the following equation.

$$\begin{align}
\langle s \rangle \sim \left|p - p_c\right|^{\gamma_p}
\end{align}$$

We can see the average cluster size suddenly diverges around the critical probability, indicating the formation of a single large cluster. It is also important to note that the exponent $\gamma_p$ is universal for all lattices, while $p_c$ is not. This is important as it indicates a universal phase transition behavior, at a point dependent on the topology. The problem of robustness in complex networks can be seen as starting with the percolating cluster, and removing a critical fraction of the pebbles for the cluster to break down. Analogous to the formation of the percolation cluster in percolation theory, the breaking down of a complex network happens abruptly during a phase transition at some critical fraction of nodes removed.

== Critical threshold for random failures ==
The mathematical derivation for the threshold at which a complex network will lose its giant component is based on the Molloy–Reed criterion.

$$\begin{align}
\kappa \equiv \frac{\langle k^2 \rangle}{\langle k \rangle} > 2
\end{align}$$

The Molloy–Reed criterion is derived from the basic principle that in order for a giant component to exist, on average each node in the network must have at least two links. This is analogous to each person holding two others' hands in order to form a chain. Using this criterion and an involved mathematical proof, one can derive a critical threshold for the fraction of nodes needed to be removed for the breakdown of the giant component of a complex network.

$$\begin{align}
f_c=1-\frac{1}{\frac{\langle k^2 \rangle}{\langle k \rangle}-1}
\end{align}$$

An important property of this finding is that the critical threshold is only dependent on the first and second moment of the degree distribution and is valid for an arbitrary degree distribution.

=== Random network ===
Using $\langle k^2 \rangle = \langle k \rangle(\langle k \rangle+1)$ for an Erdős–Rényi (ER) random graph, one can re-express the critical point for a random network.

$$\begin{align}
f_c^{ER}=1-\frac{1}{\langle k \rangle}
\end{align}$$

As a random network gets denser, the critical threshold increases, meaning a higher fraction of the nodes must be removed to disconnect the giant component.

=== Scale-free network ===
By re-expressing the critical threshold as a function of the gamma exponent for a scale-free network, we can draw a couple of important conclusions regarding scale-free network robustness.

$$\begin{align}
f_c &=1-\frac{1}{\kappa-1}\\
\kappa &=\frac{\langle k^2\rangle}{\langle k \rangle}=\left|\frac{2-\gamma}{3-\gamma}\right|A \\
A &=K_{min},~\gamma > 3 \\
A &=K_{max}^{3-\gamma}K_{min}^{\gamma-2},~3 > \gamma > 2 \\
A &=K_{max},~2 > \gamma > 1 \\
&where~K_{max}=K_{min}N^{\frac{1}{\gamma - 1}}
\end{align}$$

For $\gamma > 3$, the critical threshold only depends on gamma and the minimum degree, and in this regime the network acts like a random network breaking when a finite fraction of its nodes are removed. For $\gamma < 3$, $\kappa$ diverges in the limit as N trends toward infinity. In this case, for large scale-free networks, the critical threshold approaches 1. This essentially means almost all nodes must be removed in order to destroy the giant component, and large scale-free networks are very robust with regard to random failures. One can make intuitive sense of this conclusion by thinking about the heterogeneity of scale-free networks and of the hubs in particular. Because there are relatively few hubs, they are less likely to be removed through random failures while small low-degree nodes are more likely to be removed. Because the low-degree nodes are of little importance in connecting the giant component, their removal has little impact.

== Targeted attacks on scale-free networks ==
Although scale-free networks are resilient to random failures, we might imagine them being quite vulnerable to targeted hub removal. In this case we consider the robustness of scale free networks in response to targeted attacks, performed with thorough prior knowledge of the network topology. By considering the changes induced by the removal of a hub, specifically the change in the maximum degree and the degrees of the connected nodes, we can derive another formula for the critical threshold considering targeted attacks on a scale free network.

$$\begin{align}
f_c^{\frac{2-\gamma}{1-\gamma}}=2+\frac{2-\gamma}{3-\gamma}K_{min}(f_c^{\frac{3-\gamma}{1-\gamma}}-1)
\end{align}$$

This equation cannot be solved analytically, but can be graphed numerically. To summarize the important points, when gamma is large, the network acts as a random network, and attack robustness become similar to random failure robustness of a random network. However, when gamma is smaller, the critical threshold for attacks on scale-free networks becomes relatively small, indicating a weakness to targeted attacks.

For more detailed information on the attack tolerance of complex networks please see the attack tolerance page.

== Cascading failures ==
An important aspect of failures in many networks is that a single failure in one node might induce failures in neighboring nodes. When a small number of failures induces more failures, resulting in a large number of failures relative to the network size, a cascading failure has occurred. There are many models for cascading failures. These models differ in many details, and model different physical propagation phenomenon from power failures to information flow over Twitter, but have some shared principles. Each model focuses on some sort of propagation or cascade, there is some threshold determining when a node will fail or activate and contribute towards propagation, and there is some mechanism defined by which propagation will be directed when nodes fail or activate. All of these models predict some critical state, in which the distribution of the size of potential cascades matches a power law, and the exponent is uniquely determined by the degree exponent of the underlying network. Because of the differences in the models and the consensus of this result, we are led to believe the underlying phenomenon is universal and model-independent.

For more detailed information on modeling cascading failures, see the global cascades model page.
