= Manlio De Domenico =

Italian physicist

- Born: Manlio De Domenico; 1984 (age 41–42); Italy
- Citizenship: Italian
- Education: University of Catania (Ph.D)
- Scientific career
- Fields: network science, multilayer networks, complex adaptive systems
- Workplaces: University of Padua; Fondazione Bruno Kessler; University of Rovira i Virgili; MPIPKS; University of Birmingham; Scuola superiore di Catania

Manlio De Domenico is an Italian physicist and complex systems scientist, currently Professor of Physics at the University of Padua and previously at the Fondazione Bruno Kessler in Trento (Italy). In 2014 he has co-founded the Mediterranean School of Complex Networks, and in 2019 he has contributed to found the Italian Chapter of the Complex Systems Society, for which he served as first President.

The focus of his research is on complex adaptive systems and big data analysis, where he is best known for his theoretical and computational work in network science, statistical physics and nonlinear dynamics of multilayer systems.

== Early life and education ==
He was born in Messina in 1984. He got his Ph.D. in nuclear and astroparticle physics from the University of Catania and the Scuola Superiore di Catania in 2012, proposing a data-driven model for the propagation of Ultra-High Energy Cosmic Rays (UHECR) in a magnetized Universe and a multiscale approach to analyze their anisotropic distribution at Earth, with visiting scholarships at the Institute for Nuclear Theory of the University of Washington and the Institut de physique nucléaire d'Orsay.

== Career and research ==
He held postdoctoral positions (2012-2013) at the School of Computer Science of the University of Birmingham (UK), and (2013-2016) at the University of Rovira i Virgili (Spain). In 2016 he has been a visiting scholar at the Max Planck Institute for the Physics of Complex Systems. From 2016 to 2018 he held the "Juan de la Cierva" senior fellowship at the University of Rovira i Virgili. Since 2018 he directs the Complex Multilayer Networks (CoMuNe) Lab founded at the Fondazione Bruno Kessler.

He has published more than 190 scientific papers, with interdisciplinary contributions in computational social science, network epidemiology, network neuroscience, network medicine and systems biology. Notable works include the tensorial formulation of multilayer structure and dynamics, applications to community structure and coupling of human behavior with epidemic spreading, network geometry, network entropy for multiscale analysis of the interplay between structure and dynamics,, percolation and network robustness to perturbations,, Infodemic, and digital twin methods for precision medicine.

His work also includes studies of the architecture of living systems, bifurcations and phase transitions in the origins of life and fundamental physical and informational constraints shaping the logic of living systems.

His collaborators include Alex Arenas, Marc Barthelemy, Sylvie Briand, Guido Caldarelli, James Cronin, Shlomo Havlin, Vito Latora, Yamir Moreno, Mason Porter, Steven Strogatz and Alan Andrew Watson.

== Awards and honours ==
- 2020: Young Scientist Award for Socio- and Econophysics, from the German Physical Society for Multilayer modeling and analysis of complex socio-economic systems
- 2019: IUPAP Young Scientist Award on Statistical Physics, from the International Union of Pure and Applied Physics C3 commission, for Interdisciplinary Applications of Statistical Physics
- 2017: USERN Prize in Formal Sciences, from USERN, for modeling the complexity of systems of systems
- 2016: Junior Scientific Award, from the Complex Systems Society, for a number of pioneering contributions to the field of multilayer networks
- 2012: Bruno Rossi Prize, from the Istituto Nazionale di Fisica Nucleare (INFN) for the Best Italian PhD thesis in Nuclear and Astroparticle Physics
