= Netcordia =

Netcordia, Inc.
- Type: Private Company
- Industry: Network configuration and change management
- Founded: Annapolis, Maryland, USA (2000)
- Founder: Terry Slattery
- Headquarters: Annapolis, Maryland
- Key people: Don Pyle, previous Chairman and CEO (died January 2015 from a house fire) Terry Slattery, Vice Chairman Betsy Atkins
- Number of employees: 60 (2008)
- Website: http://www.netcordia.com

Netcordia, Inc. was a developer and marketer of network configuration and change management software. Founded in 2000 by Terry Slattery, the first non-Cisco employee to be awarded the Cisco Certified Internetwork Expert certification, Netcordia developed networking software that automate the management of network configurations, by tracking network changes and compliance requirements, such as PCI DSS, HIPAA, SOX and GLBA, and correlating how change impacts network health and performance.

In May 2010, Infoblox announced that it acquired Netcordia.

Headquartered in Annapolis, Maryland, Netcordia had a regional sales office in the United Kingdom. Customers included the United States Army, TIAA-CREF, Duke University, CareFirst Blue Cross/Blue Shield, Texas A&M University, Neiman Marcus, and The Container Store. Privately held, Netcordia was funded by Novak Biddle Venture Partners, Trinity Ventures, and Gold Hill Capital. In 2009 Netcordia was ranked the thirtieth fastest-growing privately held software company in the United States by Inc. Magazine and among Red Herring's Top 100 Most Promising Tech Companies in North America.

Infoblox is expanding into a new market segment, buying network systems management software Netcordia for an undisclosed sum. The sale was on May 4, 2010

https://www.networkcomputing.com/networking/infoblox-acquires-netcordia

== Software ==
Netcordia produced NetMRI, that automatically collects configuration (CLI), SNMP, syslog / events, and VoIP data from multi-vendor Layer 2 and 3 network devices. The NetMRI appliance records changes that are made to a network, and identifies the correlation between change and overall network health, issuing alerts that can assist network managers in fixing problems that might increase network downtime. In September 2009, Netcordia released a downloadable, VMware virtual appliance version of NetMRI.
