= NCCM =

NCCM may refer to:

- National Council of Canadian Muslims in Canada
- Network configuration and change management in information technology
