= Change management (ITSM) =

IT service management discipline

Change management is an IT service management discipline. The objective of change management in this context is to ensure that standardized methods and procedures are used for efficient and prompt handling of all changes to control IT infrastructure, in order to minimize the number and impact of any related incidents upon service. Changes in the IT infrastructure may arise reactively in response to problems or externally imposed requirements, e.g. legislative changes, or proactively from seeking improved efficiency and effectiveness or to enable or reflect business initiatives, or from programs, projects or service improvement initiatives.

Change management can ensure standardized methods, processes and procedures which are used for all changes, facilitate efficient and prompt handling of all changes, and maintain the proper balance between the need for change and the potential detrimental impact of changes. Change management within ITSM (as opposed to software engineering or project management) is often associated with ITIL, but the origins of change as an IT management process predate ITIL considerably, at least according to the IBM publication A Management System for the Information Business. For example, the IBM "Yellow Book" conception of change control (as a subset of resource control) was strictly concerned with the transfer of deliverables from projects into production. Similarly, Schiesser in IT Systems Management defines Change Management as "a process to control and coordinate all changes to an IT production environment."

== See also ==
- Network configuration and change management
- ITIL Incident Management
- ITIL Release management
- IT service management
- Patch management
