= Convolution power =

Mathematical concept

In mathematics, the convolution power is the n-fold iteration of the convolution with itself. Thus if $x$ is a function on Euclidean space R^{d} and $n$ is a natural number, then the convolution power is defined by

$$x^{*n} = \underbrace{x * x * x * \cdots * x * x}_n,\quad x^{*0}=\delta_0$$

where ∗ denotes the convolution operation of functions on R^{d} and δ_{0} is the Dirac delta distribution. This definition makes sense if x is an integrable function (in L^{1}), a rapidly decreasing distribution (in particular, a compactly supported distribution) or is a finite Borel measure.

If x is the distribution function of a random variable on the real line, then the n^{th} convolution power of x gives the distribution function of the sum of n independent random variables with identical distribution x. The central limit theorem states that if x is in L^{1} and L^{2} with mean zero and variance σ^{2}, then

$$P\left(\frac{x^{*n}}{\sigma\sqrt{n}} < \beta\right) \to \Phi(\beta)\quad\rm{as}\ n\to\infty$$

where Φ is the cumulative standard normal distribution on the real line. Equivalently, $x^{*n}/\sigma\sqrt{n}$ tends weakly to the standard normal distribution.

In some cases, it is possible to define powers x^{*t} for arbitrary real t > 0. If μ is a probability measure, then μ is infinitely divisible provided there exists, for each positive integer n, a probability measure μ_{1/n} such that

$$\mu_{1/n}^{* n} = \mu.$$

That is, a measure is infinitely divisible if it is possible to define all nth roots. Not every probability measure is infinitely divisible, and a characterization of infinitely divisible measures is of central importance in the abstract theory of stochastic processes. Intuitively, a measure should be infinitely divisible provided it has a well-defined "convolution logarithm." The natural candidate for measures having such a logarithm are those of (generalized) Poisson type, given in the form

$$\pi_{\alpha,\mu} = e^{-\alpha}\sum_{n=0}^\infty \frac{\alpha^n}{n!}\mu^{*n}.$$

In fact, the Lévy–Khinchin theorem states that a necessary and sufficient condition for a measure to be infinitely divisible is that it must lie in the closure, with respect to the vague topology, of the class of Poisson measures (Stroock 1993, §3.2).

Many applications of the convolution power rely on being able to define the analog of analytic functions as formal power series with powers replaced instead by the convolution power. Thus if $\textstyle{F(z) = \sum_{n=0}^\infty a_n z^n}$ is an analytic function, then one would like to be able to define

$$F^*(x) = a_0\delta_0 + \sum_{n=1}^\infty a_n x^{*n}.$$

If x ∈ L^{1}(R^{d}) or more generally is a finite Borel measure on R^{d}, then the latter series converges absolutely in norm provided that the norm of x is less than the radius of convergence of the original series defining F(z). In particular, it is possible for such measures to define the convolutional exponential

$$\exp^*(x) = \delta_0 + \sum_{n=1}^\infty \frac{x^{*n}}{n!}.$$

It is not generally possible to extend this definition to arbitrary distributions, although a class of distributions on which this series still converges in an appropriate weak sense is identified by Ben Chrouda, El Oued & Ouerdiane (2002).

== Properties ==
If x is itself suitably differentiable, then from the properties of convolution, one has

$$\mathcal{D}\big\{x^{*n}\big\} = (\mathcal{D}x)  * x^{*(n-1)} = x  * \mathcal{D}\big\{x^{*(n-1)}\big\}$$

where $\mathcal{D}$ denotes the derivative operator. Specifically, this holds if x is a compactly supported distribution or lies in the Sobolev space W^{1,1} to ensure that the derivative is sufficiently regular for the convolution to be well-defined.

== Applications ==
In the configuration random graph, the size distribution of connected components can be expressed via the convolution power of the excess degree distribution (Kryven (2017)):

$$w(n)=\begin{cases}
\frac{\mu_1}{n-1} u_1^{*n}(n-2),& n>1, \\
u(0) & n=1.
\end{cases}$$

Here, $w(n)$ is the size distribution for connected components, $u_1(k) = \frac{k+1}{\mu_1} u(k+1),$ is the excess degree distribution, and $u(k)$ denotes the degree distribution.

As convolution algebras are special cases of Hopf algebras, the convolution power is a special case of the (ordinary) power in a Hopf algebra. In applications to quantum field theory, the convolution exponential, convolution logarithm, and other analytic functions based on the convolution are constructed as formal power series in the elements of the algebra (Brouder, Frabetti & Patras 2008). If, in addition, the algebra is a Banach algebra, then convergence of the series can be determined as above. In the formal setting, familiar identities such as

$$x = \log^*(\exp^*x) = \exp^*(\log^*x)$$

continue to hold. Moreover, by the permanence of functional relations, they hold at the level of functions, provided all expressions are well-defined in an open set by convergent series.

== See also ==
- Convolution
- Convolution theorem
- Fourier transform
- Taylor series
