= Network complexity =

Number and type of nodes and alternative paths that exist within a computer network

Network complexity is the number of nodes and alternative paths that exist within a computer network, as well as the variety of communication media, communications equipment, protocols, and hardware and software platforms found in the network.

Simple network: A small LAN with no alternative paths, a single communication protocol, and identical hardware and software platforms across nodes would be classified as a simple network.

Complex network: An enterprise-wide network that uses multiple communication media and communication protocols to interconnect geographically distributed networks with dissimilar hardware and software platforms would be classified as a complex network.

== See also ==
- Connectivity (graph theory) – Basic concept of graph theory
- Robustness of complex networks – Ability of a complex network to withstand failures and perturbations
