= Graph entropy =

In information theory, the graph entropy is a measure of the information rate achievable by communicating symbols over a channel in which certain pairs of values may be confused. This measure, first introduced by Körner in the 1970s, has since also proven itself useful in other settings, including combinatorics.

== Definition ==
Let $G = (V, E)$ be an undirected graph. The graph entropy of $G$, denoted $H(G)$ is defined as

$$H(G) = \min_{X,Y} I(X ; Y)$$

where $X$ is chosen uniformly from $V$, $Y$ ranges over independent sets of G, the joint distribution of $X$ and $Y$ is such that $X\in Y$ with probability one, and $I(X ; Y)$ is the mutual information of $X$ and $Y$.

That is, if we let $\mathcal{I}$ denote the independent vertex sets in $G$, we wish to find the joint distribution $X,Y$ on $V \times \mathcal{I}$ with the lowest mutual information such that (i) the marginal distribution of the first term is uniform and (ii) in samples from the distribution, the second term contains the first term almost surely. The mutual information of $X$ and $Y$ is then called the entropy of $G$.

== Properties ==
- Monotonicity. If $G_1$ is a subgraph of $G_2$ on the same vertex set, then $H(G_1) \leq H(G_2)$.
- Subadditivity. Given two graphs $G_1 = (V, E_1)$ and $G_2 = (V, E_2)$ on the same set of vertices, the graph union $G_1 \cup G_2 = (V, E_1 \cup E_2)$ satisfies $H(G_1 \cup G_2) \leq H(G_1) + H(G_2)$.
- Arithmetic mean of disjoint unions. Let $G_1, G_2, \cdots, G_k$ be a sequence of graphs on disjoint sets of vertices, with $n_1, n_2, \cdots, n_k$ vertices, respectively. Then $H(G_1 \cup G_2 \cup \cdots G_k) = \tfrac{1}{\sum_{i=1}^{k}n_i}\sum_{i=1}^{k}{n_i H(G_i)}$.

Additionally, simple formulas exist for certain families classes of graphs.

- Complete balanced k-partite graphs have entropy $\log_2 k$. In particular,
  - Edge-less graphs have entropy $0$.
  - Complete graphs on $n$ vertices have entropy $\log_2 n$.
  - Complete balanced bipartite graphs have entropy $1$.
- Complete bipartite graphs with $n$ vertices in one partition and $m$ in the other have entropy $H\left(\frac{n}{m+n}\right)$, where $H$ is the binary entropy function.

== Example ==
Here, we use properties of graph entropy to provide a simple proof that a complete graph $G$ on $n$ vertices cannot be expressed as the union of fewer than $\log_2 n$ bipartite graphs.

Proof By monotonicity, no bipartite graph can have graph entropy greater than that of a complete bipartite graph, which is bounded by $1$. Thus, by sub-additivity, the union of $k$ bipartite graphs cannot have entropy greater than $k$. Now let $G = (V, E)$ be a complete graph on $n$ vertices. By the properties listed above, $H(G) = \log_2 n$. Therefore, the union of fewer than $\log_2 n$ bipartite graphs cannot have the same entropy as $G$, so $G$ cannot be expressed as such a union. $\blacksquare$

== See also ==
- Network entropy

== General References ==
- Matthias Dehmer; Frank Emmert-Streib; Zengqiang Chen; Xueliang Li; Yongtang Shi (25 July 2016). Mathematical Foundations and Applications of Graph Entropy. Wiley. ISBN 978-3-527-69325-2.
