= Scuola superiore di Catania =

Education institute in Italy

Coordinates: 37.5208°N 15.0616°E

Scuola Superiore di catania
- Type: Honours college
- Established: 1998
- Rector: Ida Angela Nicotra (President, 2025–)
- Students: about 90
- Location: Catania, Italy
- Website: scuolasuperiorecatania.it

Scuola Superiore di Catania (SSC) is an education institute in Italy. It was founded in 1998, followed by the model of Scuola Normale Superiore di Pisa. Students, who need to pass a public selection process can live for free in the school structures.

== History ==
In 2004, after a positive evaluation of the Ministry of Education, University and Research, Scuola Superiore was institutionalized within the University of Catania.

In September 2006, several ex-students founded their own association, called “Alumni Scuola Superiore di Catania”. The Association tries to maintain relationships between former students and promote activities for current students. The Scientific Director of the Scuola Superiore is an honorary member of the association. As of September 2009, the association is composed of 42 members. Among its activities, the meetings of professional guidance are where the ex-students expose postgraduate choices in Italy and abroad.

== Students ==
The students of Scuola Superiore di Catania are also students of the University of Catania and have to attend its courses. Students are required to maintain an average grade of at least 27/30 with no grade below 24/30 in order to maintain their scholarship. Apart from the normal courses, they are required to attend seven internal courses, two of which are interdisciplinary and held by professors affiliated with the University of Catania or other institutions (both Italian and foreign). Scuola Superiore provides ordinary students with free board and lodging housing, the reimbursement of tuition fees, and a monthly monetary contribution.

Students are able to manage the library services and organize a book society, cinematographic review, cultural meetings, conferences, and sports activities.

Scuola Superiore has approximately ninety undergraduate students and fifty postgraduate students. Most students are from Sicily; some are from other countries (mostly Mediterranean ones).

== Facility ==
Scuola Superiore is currently located in Villa San Saverio, a rebuilt nineteenth-century noble palace, and acts as a small independent campus. Students live in single or double rooms. The services offered to the students are a canteen, library, free Internet connection, multimedia rooms, leisure rooms, a football pitch, and a volleyball field.

The Scuola Superiore used to comprise the following laboratories:

- Laboratory for the Protection of Human Rights
- Laboratory of Design of the Landscape
- Complex Systems Laboratory

== Admission ==
The admission procedure, which usually takes place in September, consists of two written tests and an oral exam that focuses on the subjects chosen by the candidate. The oral exam requires a minimum average score of 7/10 in the written tests. The oral test required English. During the admission procedure, Scuola Superiore offers board and lodging to those candidates coming from other regions or countries. In the winter and summer, Scuola Superiore organizes short periods of educational guidance for high school students.

== Internal courses ==
During their undergraduate careers, students at Scuola Superiore must attend a minimum of seven internal courses. Five of them must deal with specific topics belonging to a degree course, while the remaining two of them are interdisciplinary. Specialist courses are proposed by teachers and students together and have to be approved by the didactic panel of the Scuola Superiore.

Students must also attend auxiliary courses in foreign languages and computer science. Students can attend English courses in order to obtain an international certification. Apart from English, students have to attend among French, German, and Spanish courses.

Scuola Superiore funds stages with public and private companies or universities.

== International PhDs ==
The following international PhDs used to be offered at Scuola Superiore:

- Energy;
- Nanoscience;
- Stem cell research;
- Global politics and European integration;
- Nuclear physics and particle astrophysics;

== See also ==
- Catania
- University of Catania
- Scuola Normale Superiore di Pisa
