= Sylvie Briand =

French physician

Sylvie
- Education: Paul Sabatier University
- Scientific career
- Workplaces: World Health Organization; CREDES
- Thesis: Analyse critique des differentes methodologies d'evaluation des systemes de surveillance epidemiologique : l'exemple equatorien (1999)

Sylvie Champaloux Briand is a French physician who is Director of the Pandemic and Epidemic Diseases Department at the World Health Organization. Briand led the Global Influenza Programme during the 2009 swine flu pandemic. During the COVID-19 pandemic, Briand launched the WHO Information Network for Epidemics which looked to counter the spread of COVID-19 misinformation.

== Early life and education ==
Briand completed her doctorate in medicine at Paul Sabatier University in Toulouse. After graduating, she completed a master's degree in public health and a doctorate in epidemiology. She started her medical career working in the Hôpitaux de Toulouse. Briand became increasingly interested in public health, and worked with the European Commission in South America on PROCED, a project which looked to control the re-emergence of cholera in South America.

== Research and career ==
In 1999, Briand joined CREDES international, a public health consultancy. In 2001 she joined the World Health Organization (WHO). Her first role at the WHO was as medical officer in the Global Task force on Cholera Control, where she developed technical guidance for the management of cholera. She was appointed lead for the Yellow Fever Initiative. The Yellow Fever Initiative saw 100 million people being vaccinated in Africa, which eliminated yellow fever outbreaks in West Africa. The 2016 yellow fever outbreak in Angola created an urgent need for 28 million vaccinations, which exhausted the global supply. In response to this outbreak, Briand launched the Eliminate Yellow fever Epidemics initiative, which looked to (1) protect the most vulnerable populations, (2) prevent the spread of yellow fever internationally and (3) contain local outbreaks quickly.

In her next role at the WHO, Briand joined the influenza group, and was promoted to Director of the Global Influenza Programme in 2009. In 2012 she was made Director of the Pandemic and Epidemic Diseases, which oversees projects on antimicrobial resistance, the WHO pandemic preparedness framework and several disease control programmes. In 2013 Briand worked with UNICEF to launch the Battle against Respiratory Viruses (BRaVe) initiative, which recognised acute respiratory infections represent a significant public health problem. Briand emphasised that 97% of deaths due to pneumonia occur in the developing world. The BRaVE initiative created a public health agenda that addressed gaps of knowledge on respiratory infections, partnered with decision making bodies and engaged with the pharmaceutical industry.

In 2017 Briand was involved with the launch of OpenWHO, a massive open online course that trained first responders in how to handle medical emergencies. The MOOC included four channels, covering outbreaks, emergency responses, social skills and emergency field work. She established EDCARN, a network of clinicians all around the world who trained health workers to fight the Western African Ebola virus epidemic. She developed a pocket guide which outlined best practise on the management of Ebola patients with viral haemorrhagic fever which was distributed around community care centres and Ebola treatment units. Alongside providing acute medical advice, Briand emphasised the need to engage communities to stop the spread of the disease, as well as burying patients who die with dignity and appropriate safety precautions. The management of Ebola was a complex challenge; making burials safe required the World Health Organization to adapt their advice to address local beliefs. After the Ebola outbreak, Briand called for more social scientists to be involved with the management of epidemics. She hoped that this would help to understand why people do or do not cooperate with public health advice, and how to better design and adapt interventions so that they were more efficient and effective.

Briand was closely involved with the WHO response to the COVID-19 pandemic. Amidst the extraordinary number of scientific studies, COVID-19 inspired considerable misinformation and pseudoscience. Working with the WHO, Briand led the creation of the Information Network for Epidemics, a strategy to counter the infodemic that spread online. She encouraged people, including politicians, to avoid shaking hands, and instead use elbow bumps or footshakes. In May 2020, Briand emphasised that it was crucial to know how SARS-CoV-2 evolved. She said that the WHO were surprised by the lack of global preparedness in fighting coronavirus disease. She believes that after the severe acute respiratory syndrome (SARS) outbreak, countries prepared; they created stockpiles and made plans. But the 2009 swine flu pandemic was deemed "not all that bad", and the world experienced what Briand deemed "pandemic fatigue". Making use of the OpenWHO, Briand launched an online programme in coronavirus disease.

== Selected publications ==
- Briand, Sylvie; Bertherat, Eric; Cox, Paul; Formenty, Pierre; Kieny, Marie-Paule; Myhre, Joel K.; Roth, Cathy; Shindo, Nahoko; Dye, Christopher (2014-09-25). "The International Ebola Emergency". New England Journal of Medicine. 371 (13): 1180–1183. doi:10.1056/NEJMp1409858. ISSN 0028-4793. PMID 25140855.
- Gessner, Bradford D; Shindo, Nahoko; Briand, Sylvie (2011-03-01). "Seasonal influenza epidemiology in sub-Saharan Africa: a systematic review". The Lancet Infectious Diseases. 11 (3): 223–235. doi:10.1016/S1473-3099(11)70008-1. ISSN 1473-3099. PMID 21371656.
- Mocharla, Pavani; Briand, Sylvie; Giannotti, Giovanna; Dörries, Carola; Jakob, Philipp; Paneni, Francesco; Lüscher, Thomas; Landmesser, Ulf (2013-01-03). "AngiomiR-126 expression and secretion from circulating CD34+ and CD14+ PBMCs: role for proangiogenic effects and alterations in type 2 diabetics". Blood. 121 (1): 226–236. doi:10.1182/blood-2012-01-407106. ISSN 0006-4971. PMID 23144172. S2CID 7877800.
