= Giant component =

Large connected component of a random graph

An Erdős–Rényi–Gilbert random graph with 1000 vertices at the critical edge probability $p=1/(n-1)$, showing a large component and many small ones. At this edge probability, the large component is not yet a giant component: it contains only a sublinear number of vertices.

In network theory, a giant component is a connected component of a given random graph that contains a significant fraction of the entire graph's vertices.

More precisely, in graphs drawn randomly from a probability distribution over arbitrarily large graphs, a giant component is a connected component whose fraction of the overall number of vertices is bounded away from zero. In sufficiently dense graphs distributed according to the Erdős–Rényi model, a giant component exists with high probability.

== Giant component in Erdős–Rényi model ==
Giant components are a prominent feature of the Erdős–Rényi model (ER) of random graphs, in which each possible edge connecting pairs of a given set of n vertices is present, independently of the other edges, with probability p. In this model, if $p \le \frac{1-\epsilon}{n}$ for any constant $\epsilon>0$, then with high probability (in the limit as $n$ goes to infinity) all connected components of the graph have size O(log n), and there is no giant component. However, for $p \ge \frac{1 + \epsilon}{n}$ there is with high probability a single giant component, with all other components having size O(log n). For $p=p_c = \frac{1}{n}$, intermediate between these two possibilities, the number of vertices in the largest component of the graph, $P_{\inf}$ is with high probability proportional to $n^{2/3}$.

Giant component is also important in percolation theory. When a fraction of nodes, $q=1-p$, is removed randomly from an ER network of degree $\langle k \rangle$, there exists a critical threshold, $p_c= \frac{1}{\langle k \rangle}$. Above $p_c$ there exists a giant component (largest cluster) of size, $P_{\inf}$. $P_{\inf}$ fulfills, $P_{\inf}=p(1-\exp(-\langle k \rangle P_{\inf}))$. For $p<p_c$ the solution of this equation is $P_{\inf}=0$, i.e., there is no giant component.

At $p_c$, the distribution of cluster sizes behaves as a power law, $n(s)$~$s^{-5/2}$ which is a feature of phase transition.

Alternatively, if one adds randomly selected edges one at a time, starting with an empty graph, then it is not until approximately $n/2$ edges have been added that the graph contains a large component, and soon after that the component becomes giant. More precisely, when t edges have been added, for values of t close to but larger than $n/2$, the size of the giant component is approximately $4t-2n$. However, according to the coupon collector's problem, $\Theta(n\log n)$ edges are needed in order to have high probability that the whole random graph is connected.

== Graphs with arbitrary degree distributions ==
A similar sharp threshold between parameters that lead to graphs with all components small and parameters that lead to a giant component also occurs in tree-like random graphs with non-uniform degree distributions $P(k)$. The degree distribution does not define a graph uniquely. However, under the assumption that in all respects other than their degree distribution, the graphs are treated as entirely random, many results on finite/infinite-component sizes are known. In this model, the existence of the giant component depends only on the first two (mixed) moments of the degree distribution. Let a randomly chosen vertex have degree $k$, then the giant component exists if and only if
$$\langle k^2 \rangle - 2 \langle k \rangle>0.$$
This is known as the Molloy and Reed condition. The first moment of $P(k)$ is the mean degree of the network. In general, the $n$-th moment is defined as $\langle k^n \rangle = \mathbb E [k^n] = \sum k^n P(k)$.

When there is no giant component, the expected size of the small component can also be determined by the first and second moments and it is $1+\frac{\langle k \rangle ^2}{2\langle k \rangle + \langle k^2 \rangle}.$ However, when there is a giant component, the size of the giant component is more tricky to evaluate.

== Criteria for giant component existence in directed and undirected configuration graphs ==
Similar expressions are also valid for directed graphs, in which case the degree distribution is two-dimensional. There are three types of connected components in directed graphs. For a randomly chosen vertex:

1. out-component is a set of vertices that can be reached by recursively following all out-edges forward;
2. in-component is a set of vertices that can be reached by recursively following all in-edges backward;
3. weak component is a set of vertices that can be reached by recursively following all edges regardless of their direction.

Let a randomly chosen vertex have $k_\text{in}$ in-edges and $k_\text{out}$ out edges. By definition, the average number of in- and out-edges coincides so that $c = \mathbb E [k_\text{in}] =\mathbb E [k_\text{out}]$. If $G_0(x) = \textstyle \sum_{k} \displaystyle P(k)x^k$ is the generating function of the degree distribution $P(k)$ for an undirected network, then $G_1(x)$ can be defined as $G_1(x) = \textstyle \sum_{k} \displaystyle \frac{k}{\langle k \rangle}P(k)x^{k-1}$. For directed networks, generating function assigned to the joint probability distribution $P(k_{in}, k_{out})$ can be written with two variables $x$ and $y$ as: $\mathcal{G}(x,y) = \sum_{k_{in},k_{out}} \displaystyle P({k_{in},k_{out}})x^{k_{in}}y^{k_{out}}$, then one can define $g(x) = \frac{1}{c} {\partial \mathcal{G}\over\partial x}\vert _{y=1}$ and $f(y) = \frac{1}{c} {\partial \mathcal{G}\over\partial y}\vert _{x=1}$. The criteria for giant component existence in directed and undirected random graphs are given in the table below:

Type	Criteria
undirected: giant component	$\mathbb E [k^2] - 2 \mathbb E [k]>0$, or $G'_1(1)=1$
directed: giant in/out-component	$\mathbb E [k_\text{in}k_{out}] - \mathbb E [k_\text{in}]>0$, or $g'_1(1)= f'_1(1) = 1$
directed: giant weak component	$2\mathbb{E}[k_\text{in}] \mathbb{E}[k_\text{in}k_\text{out}] - \mathbb{E}[k_\text{in}] \mathbb{E}[k_\text{out}^2] - \mathbb{E}[k_\text{in}] \mathbb{E}[k_\text{in}^2] +\mathbb{E}[k_\text{in}^2]\mathbb{E}[k_\text{out}^2] - \mathbb{E}[k_\text{in} k_\text{out}]^2 >0$

== See also ==
- Complex network – Network with non-trivial topological features
- Erdős–Rényi model – Two closely related models for generating random graphs
- Fractals – Infinitely detailed mathematical structure
- Graph theory – Area of discrete mathematics
- Interdependent networks – Subfield of network science
- Network science – Academic field
- Percolation theory – Mathematical theory on behavior of connected clusters in a random graph
- Percolation – Filtration of fluids through porous materials
- Scale-free network – Network whose degree distribution follows a power law
