= Network configuration and change management =

Network configuration and change management (NCCM) is a discipline in information technology. Organizations utilize NCCM as a way to:

- automate changes;
- reduce network downtime;
- network device configuration backup & restore;
- meet compliance.

== See also ==
- Change Management (ITSM)
- Computer networking
