= Bit by Bit =

Bit by bit indicates a gradual change. It may also refer to:

- bit-by-bit algorithm, an efficient algorithm to calculate trigonometric and other functions that converges one digit (or bit) per iteration.

Bit by Bit, Bit By Bit and Bit-by-Bit may refer to:

== Film and television ==
- Bit by Bit (2012), a short film starring Karan Soni, American.
- "Bit by Bit" (2007), a television episode of Big Windup!, a Japanese baseball-themed anime series based on the manga.
- "Bit by Bit" (2008), a television episode of WordWorld, an American animated educational children's television series.
- "Bit by Bit" (2015), a television episode of CSI: Cyber, an American police procedural drama.
- "Bit by Bit" (2022), a television episode of Sasaki and Miyano, a Japanese manga series adapted to anime.

== Music ==
- "Bit by Bit" (1985), the theme from Fletch by Stephanie Mills, an American singer, songwriter and actress.
- だんだん ("Bit by bit") (1996), a song from Humanity by The Mad Capsule Markets, Japanese hardcore punk.
- "Bit by Bit" (1996), a work for orchestra by Dirk Brossé, a Belgian conductor and composer.
- "Bit by Bit" (1999), a song from Forever Took Too Long by John Landry, Canadian country.
- 점점 ("Bit By Bit") (2002), a song from Reason 4 Breathing? by Brown Eyes, a South Korean singing duo.
- "Bit by Bit" (2007), a song from Freedom Lasso by Akala, a British rapper, writer and activist
- "Bit By Bit" (2007), a song from Lionheart: Tussle with the Beast by Klashnekoff, English rapper.
- "Bit by Bit" (2012), a song from The Sticks by Mother Mother, Canadian indie rock.
- "Bit By Bit" (2013), a song from All I Want by The Reverb Junkie, an American music producer, songwriter and vocalist.
- "Bit by Bit" (2016), a song from Retrogore by Aborted, Belgian death metal.
- "Bit by bit" (一點點) (2020) a song from Folio Vol.1: One and One, by Qing-Feng Wu, Taiwanese singer-songwriter. Music by Yoga Lin .

== Audio ==
- Bit by Bit (2005–present), a regular podcast segment of PotterCast, a Harry Potter fansite.
- "Bit by Bit" (2022), a podcast from Lore, a documentary hosted by Aaron Mahnke.

== Literature ==
- Bit by Bit: An Illustrated History of Computers (1984), a book by Stan Augarten, American.
- Bit by Bit (1995), a children's book by Steve Sanfield, American poet, author, and Freedom Rider.
- Bit by Bit: How P2P is Freeing the World (2015), an e-book by Jeffrey Tucker, an American libertarian writer, publisher, and entrepreneur.
- Bit by Bit: How Video Games Transformed Our World (2017), a book by Andrew Ervin, American.
- Bit By Bit: Social Research in the Digital Age (2018), a book by Matthew J. Salganik, American sociologist.
- "Bit-by-Bit" (2019), a manga chapter from Ace of Diamond, by Yuji Terajima, Japanese artist.
- Bit By Bit: A Catalyst Guide To Advancing Women In High Tech Companies (2003), a publication of Catalyst (nonprofit organization).
- "Bit by Bit" (1989–1994), a column in Computer Language by Stan Kelly-Bootle, a British author, academic, singer-songwriter and computer scientist.
- "Bit by Bit" (2008), a webcomics chapter of Red String, by Gina Biggs, Japanese.

== Other uses ==
- Bit by Bit, a role in Myrra & Helen starred by Myrra Malmberg, a Swedish singer, dancer, songwriter, and photographer
- Bit by Bit (2005), an art exhibit showcasing Analia Saban, an Argentinian-American contemporary conceptual artist, and Lisa Lapinski, an American visual artist
- Bit by Bit Company, a company that produced shows such as Boys' Lockdown (2020), and Games People Play (2015)

== See also ==
- "Bit by Bit, Frame by Frame" (1962), a television show hosted by Roald Øyen, Norwegian.
- "Bit By Bit (We're Building a Set)" (2003), a song from Whoo Hoo! Wiggly Gremlins! by The Wiggles, Australian children's music.
- "Little by Little, Bit by Bit" (2013), a manga episode from This Art Club Has a Problem!, Japanese.
