= Mikaela Fudolig =

Filipino physicist and former child prodigy

- Born: Mikaela Irene Dimaano Fudolig; 1990 or 1991
- Education: University of the Philippines Diliman
- Known for: Earning her undergraduate degree at the age of 16
- Scientific career
- Fields: Physics; Computational social science
- Workplaces: University of the Philippines Diliman; Ateneo de Manila University; Energy Development Corporation; Asia Pacific Center for Theoretical Physics; University of Vermont; Adelaide University
- Thesis: Analytic treatment of consensus achievement in two-level opinion dynamics models of completely connected agents with single-type zealots. (2014)

Mikaela Irene Dimaano Fudolig (born 1990 or 1991) is a Filipino physicist and former child prodigy. In 2007, she earned her bachelor's degree in physics at the age of 16 as valedictorian of the University of the Philippines Diliman. She then pursued an academic career, initially at UP Diliman and Ateneo de Manila University, before moving to South Korea, the United States, and Australia. As of the 2020s, she specializes in computational social science.

== Life and career ==
Fudolig was a sophomore at Quezon City Science High School before being pulled into the experimental Early College Placement Program (ECPP). At the age of 11, she began her university education at the University of the Philippines Diliman (UP Diliman). She was admitted without a high school diploma and without taking the UP College Admission Test (UPCAT).

In 2007, at 16 years old, Fudolig graduated with a bachelor's degree in physics, summa cum laude, from UP Diliman. With a general weighted average of 1.099, (Note: Most state universities and colleges in the Philippines follow the grade point system scale of 1.00 to 5.00, in which 1.00 is the highest possible grade and 5.00 (failure) is the lowest possible grade. see Academic grading in the Philippines.) she was the class valedictorian. She then joined the faculty of the National Institute of Physics after graduation.

She earned her Master of Science degree in physics, and in 2014 her PhD from UP Diliman with her dissertation entitled, "Analytic treatment of consensus achievement in two-level opinion dynamics models of completely connected agents with single-type zealots." She was also a Fulbright scholar for doctoral enrichment in behavioral economics at the University of California, Irvine, where she was under the supervision of Donald G. Saari.

Fudolig has worked as a research and development specialist for the Energy Development Corporation (EDC), and as an assistant professor at Ateneo de Manila University from 2016 to 2017. In 2016, she was admitted to the University of the Philippines College of Law.

By 2018–19, Fudolig was a postdoctoral researcher at the Asia Pacific Center for Theoretical Physics in Pohang, South Korea. By 2023, she was a postdoctoral researcher in the field of computational social science at the University of Vermont (UVM). At UVM, she worked with her supervisors Chris Danforth and Peter Dodds. As of 2025, she is a lecturer at the School of Mathematical Sciences of Adelaide University (Note: She joined the University of Adelaide in 2025, which was then in the process of merging with the University of South Australia, forming Adelaide University which officially opened in 2026. See Adelaide University.) in Australia.

== Selected publications ==
- Fudolig, M. I. D. & Esguerra, J. P. H. (2014). Analytic treatment of consensus achievement in the single-type zealotry voter model. Physica A: Statistical Mechanics and its Applications. 413: 626–634.
- Fudolig, M. I. D.; Monsivais, D.; Bhattacharya, K.; Jo, H. H. & Kaski, K. (2019). Different patterns of social closeness observed in mobile phone communication. Journal of Computational Social Science. 3 (1): 1–17. doi: 10.1007/s42001-019-00054-8
- Fudolig, M. I. D.; Bhattacharya, K.; Monsivais, D.; Jo, H. H. & Kaski, K. (2020). Link-centric analysis of variation by demographics in mobile phone communication patterns. PLoS ONE. 15(1): e0227037. doi: 10.1371/journal.pone.0227037
- Fudolig, M. I., Alshaabi, T., Arnold, M. V., Danforth, C. M., & Dodds, P. S. (2022). Sentiment and structure in word co-occurrence networks on Twitter. Applied Network Science, 7(1), 27. doi: 10.1007/s41109-022-00446-2
- Fudolig, M. I.; Bloomfield, L. S. P.; Price, M.; Bird, Y. M.; Hidalgo, J. E.; Kim, J. N. . . . Danforth, C. M. (2024). The two fundamental shapes of sleep heart rate dynamics and their connection to mental health in college students. Digital Biomarkers, 8(1), 120-131. doi: 10.1159/000539487. PMID: 39015512
