= Umali =

Umali may refer to:

- Umali (surname), Tagalog-language surname
- Umali, India, a village in the Buldhana district of Maharashtra
- Om Ali, a dessert in Egyptian cuisine
