= Peter Dodds (mathematician) =

American computer scientist and professor

Peter Sheridan Dodds
- Born: Australia
- Education: University of Melbourne, B. Sci. & B. of Electrical Engineering, 1993, Master of Science in Theoretical & Mathematical Physics, 1994; Massachusetts Institute of Technology, 2000.
- Spouse: Aimee Picchi
- Awards: Fellow of the Network Science Society (NetSci), 2021.
- Scientific career
- Fields: Applied mathematics, Sociology, Complex systems, Physics, Computer science, Computational biology, Geology
- Thesis: Geometry of River Networks (2000)
- Doctoral advisor: Daniel H. Rothman
- Doctoral students: Roby Muhamad, Matthew J. Salganik
- Website: petersheridandodds.com

Peter Sheridan Dodds is an Australian applied Mathematician. He is the director of the Vermont Complex Systems Institute and Professor at the University of Vermont's Department of Mathematics and Statistics. He has collaborated in several researches related to big data problems in areas as language, stories, sociotechnical systems, complex systems, Earth science, biology, and ecology. With Chris Danforth, he co-runs the Computational Story Lab, the MassMutual Center of Excellence in Complex Systems and Data Science, and together, they developed the hedonometer.

Recent research directed by Dodds has been commented on in The New York Times, Smithsonian Magazine, and other media. In October 2020, the Hedonometor tool created by Dodds and his Danforth analyzed the sentiment of people through their tweets to identify May 31 as the saddest day recorded.

In Dodds's early career, from 2002 to 2007, he was a frequent collaborator of Duncan J. Watts.

In 2016, Dodds collaborated with Danforth and Mark Ibrahim on writing about the phenomenon where Wikipedia articles are connected by "Philosophy".

In 2023, as part of a group of researchers in the Vermont Complex Systems Institute, he helped win a National Science Foundation award to study the science of stories. This 5-year grant was called The Science of Online Corpora, Knowledge, and Stories (SOCKS).

== Selected works ==
- Dodds, P. S., Alshaabi, T., Fudolig, M. I., Zimmerman, J. W., Lovato, J., Beaulieu, S., Minot, J. R., Arnold, M. V., Reagan, A. J., & Danforth, C. M. (2021). Ousiometrics and Telegnomics: The essence of meaning conforms to a two-dimensional powerful-weak and dangerous-safe framework with diverse corpora presenting a safety bias. ArXiv:2110.06847 [Physics]. arxiv.org/abs/2110.06847
- Dodds, P. S., Harris, K. D., Kloumann, I. M., Bliss, C. A., & Danforth, C. M. (2011). Temporal Patterns of Happiness and Information in a Global Social Network: Hedonometrics and Twitter. PLoS ONE, 6(12), e26752. doi.org/10.1371/journal.pone.0026752
- Dodds, P. S., Minot, J. R., Arnold, M. V., Alshaabi, T., Adams, J. L., Dewhurst, D. R., Gray, T. J., Frank, M. R., Reagan, A. J., & Danforth, C. M. (2020). Allotaxonometry and rank-turbulence divergence: A universal instrument for comparing complex systems. ArXiv:2002.09770 [Physics].
- Dodds, P. S., Minot, J. R., Arnold, M. V., Alshaabi, T., Adams, J. L., Dewhurst, D. R., Reagan, A. J., & Danforth, C. M. (2021). Fame and Ultrafame: Measuring and comparing daily levels of `being talked about’ for United States’ presidents, their rivals, God, countries, and K-pop. ArXiv:1910.00149 [Physics].
