= Quezon City Science High School =

Public high school in Quezon City, Philippines

Quezon City Science High School NCR Regional Science High School
- Mataas na Paaralang Pang-Agham ng Lungsod Quezon (Filipino)

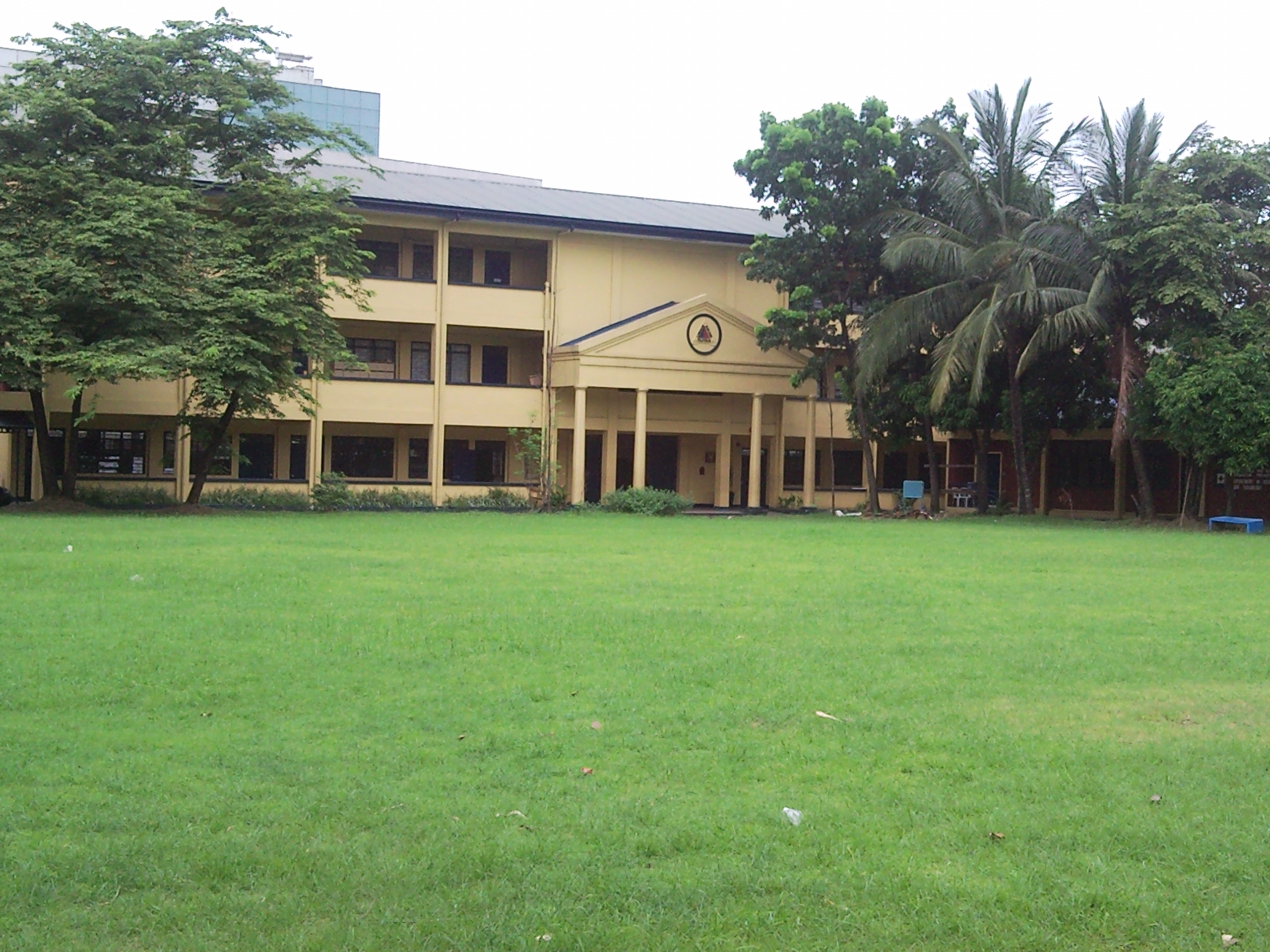
- Mathay Hall I, one of the buildings within the campus.

Location
- Quezon City, Metro Manila; Philippines
- Coordinates: 14°39′30.43″N 121°1′49.69″E

Information
- Other names: QueSci, Kisay, Scientia, Xientia, RegSci, Kyusisyans, Qsci, Scientians
- Type: Public Special Regional Science High School
- Motto: Scientia et virtus; Empowering minds. Strengthening Character ("Knowledge And Virtue")
- Established: 1967
- School code: 305329
- Principal: Mr. George Emanuel F. Martin
- Grades: 7 to 12
- Language: English, Filipino, Spanish, French, Latin, Chinese
- Campus: Barangay Santo Cristo, Bago Bantay, Quezon City
- Campus size: 9.4 hectares
- Campus type: Urban
- Colors: Blue and White
- Nickname: Paladium/Lady Paladium. (Basketball and other sports); Griffins/Lady Griffins (Volleyball); Himig Scientia (Choir); Indak Xientia or Elite Scientia (Dance) Knights/Lady Knights (Soccer); Corsairs (Frisbee); Scientian (Students)
- Publication: The Electron (English); Banyuhay (Filipino)
- Affiliations: Division of City Schools - Quezon City; Regional Science High School Union
- Website: qcshs.depedqc.ph

Quezon City Science High School (also referred as QueSci or Kisay) is the Regional Science High School for the National Capital Region and the premier science high school of Quezon City. It is located at Golden Acres Road, Corner Misamis Street, Bago-Bantay, Quezon City, Philippines. Founded on September 17, 1967, it was appointed as the Regional Science High School for the National Capital Region since 1998. The science high school is notable for its student selectivity as it requires at least a 75 percent score in each of the domains of the Unified Science High School Admissions Test, the only school with additional criteria.

== History ==
In 1963, Hermenigilda G. Margate, the then Division Science Supervisor, received authorization from Alfredo J. Andal, City Superintendent of Schools, in 1967 to establish a special first-year class following a Special Science Curriculum at Quirino High School and San Francisco High School. Subsequently, a first-year class was introduced each year in both schools, with students progressing to the next year level until 1967 when they reached their fourth year.

On July 11, 1967, a memorandum was issued to all principals, assistant principals, head teachers, Margate, Mathematics and Science Supervisors, all designated by the City Superintendent, instructing them to organize and oversee the formation of Quezon City Science High School.

Initially, the school shared facilities with Judge Juan Luna High School in San Francisco Del Monte. However, in 1969, the school relocated to the site of the former San Jose Seminary, which the Quezon City General Hospital is currently located.

In 1969, the Quezon City Council, through the leadership of the then Vice Mayor Ismael A. Mathay, Jr, donated the present school site, measuring 2.4 hectares under Quezon City Government with TCT# 265553 in Barangay Sto. Cristo, Bago Bantay, Quezon City in 1969.

In 1976, a two-story semi-concrete six-room building was constructed with the representation of the former Schools Superintendent Commemoracion M. Concepcion to the Quezon City Board.

Another two-story six room concrete science building was finally completed in 1983 through the then City Mayor Adelina S. Rodriguez and the incumbent Division Superintendent, Dr. Edna B. Azurin. Azurin also equipped the school with a speech laboratory and fully air-conditioned computer rooms.

In 1989, the National Secondary Education Curriculum (NSEC), under the Secondary Development Program, implemented the teaching of Science and Technology and Mathematics. QCSHS was chosen as the Regional Leader School in the National Capital Region (NCR).

Following that, additional laboratory rooms for Chemistry, Biology, and Integrated Science were provided through the U.S. Aid Program, along with a new Home Economics building for the Technology and Home Economics (T.H.E.) department.

QCSHS was selected to lead the implementation of a new technology-based curriculum initiated by the government, with two pilot classes formed to test the curriculum's effectiveness. Between 1995 and 1997, more rooms were constructed, including Mathay Hall, Icasiano-Calalay, DOST Chemistry, and Physics laboratory buildings. The school also saw improvements in its Library, Science and Mathematics centers, Conference Hall, Multi-purpose Covered Court, Computer Science Centers, Faculty Room, and CAT headquarters.

In 1999, Mayor Ismael A. Mathay Jr. spearheaded the construction of a four-story sixteen-room concrete building, and Dr. Aquilina S. Rivas, the Schools Division Superintendent, oversaw the renovation of the DOST Laboratory.

In June 1999, Quezon City Science High School was officially declared the Regional Science High School for the National Capital Region, aligning with R.A. 8496 (An Act to Establish the Philippine Science High School System and Providing Funds Therefore). This led to the introduction of a new screening process for incoming freshmen, initiated by the Division of City Schools under Dr. Aquilina S. Rivas' leadership. In March 2001, Dr. Rivas transferred QCSHS to the DepEd NCR. On February 11, 2003, Dr. Corazon Santiago, then Regional Director of DepEd NCR, returned the school to the Division of City School, along with administrative and supervisory functions.

=== June 2016 to present ===
Senior High School Academic Track STEM strand is offered at QCSHS. Under the leadership of Rosavilla T. Dacquel, the then Head Teacher VI of the Science Department, along with the six faculty members who served as pioneer teachers of the 288 senior high school students, the first year of senior high school in QCSHS was implemented. Changes in the curriculum led to improvements in school facilities, including the construction of new buildings, rehabilitation of the football field, and the transformation of the Covered Court into a modern structure housing new laboratories and a gymnasium.

== Notable alumni ==
- Joyce Pring - television personality and host
- Elisse Joson - actress
- Mikaela Fudolig - physicist and former child prodigy
- Tonisito Umali - politician, former Deputy Director-General of Technical Education and Skills Development Authority (TESDA)
- Josh Ford - actor, known for his participation in PBB Collab Edition (recently visited in 2025 with Mad Ramos, GMA)
- Sue Prado - actress

== Controversy ==
In 2009, during the sacking of publications supervised by adviser Rex San Diego, several students vented their angst on the Internet against principal Zenaida Sadsad. Several students created blogs targeting the school administration and its anomalous policies. These students criticized the partial policies being implemented in the school as well as the administration's oppression towards dissenting opinions. These blogs earned the students sanctions, which took toll when four students were suspended for more than a week.

In 2013, a complaint affidavit was filed against Dr. Zenaida Sadsad. The affidavit includes the issues of: 1) accepting student applicants who did not actually meet the grade requirement of QCSHS. 2) openly endorsing Brainworks/Brainchamps Tutorial Learning Center to QCSHS student applicants, with the assurance of guaranteed admission slot in the school. The center boasts of 100% passing rate to the said science high school. 3) leaking out periodical test questions to said tutorial center. 4) threatening teachers who are spreading the issue of the test leakage with a libel suit and removal from service. Dr. Sadsad was temporarily moved to another school on the months of January to March 2010. She resumed office on April until her permanent transfer on September 30, 2013.
