= University of the Philippines College Admission Test =

College admission test

The University of the Philippines College Admission Test, commonly known as the UPCAT (Tagalog: ['ʊpkat]), is part of the admission requirements for the University of the Philippines System and is administered to Filipino and foreign high school graduates. The test was first administered in 1968.

== Eligibility and application ==
To be considered eligible for the UPCAT, an applicant should be any of the following:

1. A 12th-grade student of a secondary school that is accredited by the Department of Education;
2. A graduate of any secondary school that is accredited by the Department of Education, or of any secondary school abroad; or
3. An individual who has been declared eligible to enter college according to the Philippine Educational Placement Test (PEPT) results.

In addition, graduates must not have taken and must not be taking any college subjects. They should not plan to take any college subjects before the semester or academic year of the UPCAT.

The deadline for filing applications for the UPCAT is announced regularly, usually from late July to early August.

The UPCAT can only be taken once by an applicant. Any applicant who has taken the examination is ineligible to retake it.

== University Predicted Grade ==
The University Predicted Grade (UPG) is a combined score of an applicant's weighted UPCAT score (60%) and the weighted average of their grades in high school (40%). The admission test results are ranked according to the examinees' UPGs.

Socioeconomic and geographic factors are also considered in selecting campus qualifiers to make the student population of UP more representative of the country's population.

== Qualifying for a campus and a degree program ==
Applicants must specify two campuses, in order of preference, from the U.P. System's nine constituent universities, and two satellite campuses (the extension programs in Pampanga and Olongapo under UP Diliman). For each campus chosen, two degree programs must also be specified (but applicants may select up to four). UPCAT applications are processed according to the order of these preferences.

The top-ranked applicants (according to the UPG), based on the quota and cut-off grades of each campus, are eligible to enter. Different grade predictors are applied for each degree program. Top-ranked qualifiers are accepted depending on the slots available in that program.

If the applicants do not qualify for the two preferred campuses, they may request to be included in the wait list, provided they have stated the campus they would apply to as their first or second choice.

If they are UPCAT qualifiers, they only need to find a degree program that will accept them. The campus Registrar's Office will help them find that degree program. Qualification into UP is, therefore, a matter of qualifying for a campus, regardless of the choice of degree program.

== Examination ==
The five-hour examination covers language proficiency, reading comprehension, mathematics, and science. UPCAT questions can be in English or Filipino. The exam is usually administered on a Saturday and Sunday in early August, with two batches of examinations per day: one in the morning and the other in the afternoon.

UPCAT test centers are found in major schools throughout the Philippines, including all UP campuses. More than 100,000 applicants take the UPCAT yearly, with almost 40,000 in UP Diliman alone. Because the campus is open and connected to major public roads, heavy traffic is expected at this time of year. Food stalls and other tiangges set up shop everywhere around the Diliman campus, especially the Academic Oval, to provide the needs of parents and guardians who accompany and wait for the applicants taking the test.

== Admission results ==
All UPCAT news and results are announced on the university's website, usually around January, with the results by April. The list of qualified applicants is also posted outside the U.P. Office of Admissions. Aside from these, a list of examinees and their corresponding qualifying status is sent to their respective high schools. Finally, individual letters containing qualifying information and further instructions, if any, are sent to the individual examinees.

Around 10%-15% of the examinees pass the UPCAT and qualify for admission to the university every year. In 2016, in the first UPCAT conducted in the fully enforced K+12 system in the country, out of 10,000 applicants, only around 1,500 passed. The university has since seen applications for the UPCAT exceeding 100,000 annually since 2017, the first time that the first K+12 system graduates have taken the examinations. In 2019, with RA 10931 enforced, institutionalizing free tuition across state universities and colleges (SUCs), a record-high 90,426 applicants took the test. Of this, 11,821 qualified for admission.

Since 2018, the UPCAT results can be accessed via any WAP-enabled device (such as PDAs and mobile phones) at the university's official WAP site. From 2019 onwards, in consideration of the country's Data Privacy Act, the viewing of results shifted to a new system, ending the era of public viewing via a master list, with student applicants requested to log in using the email address and password used during the online application process.

In the late 2010s, UPCAT results were infamous for being released late relative to other major Philippine universities, which have cost some parents upwards of ₱5,000.00 in reservation fees in different universities. This has also caused great anxiety to applicants because they only release a range of weeks or months, resulting in applicants checking every day of that month or week. The UPCAT was suspended from 2020 to 2022 due to the COVID-19 pandemic but reinstated in 2023, the first time the number of examinees breached the 100,000 mark.

Out of 135,236 examinees who took the UPCAT 2025, there were 17,996 who received an admission notice or 13.31% of all test-takers. For UPCAT 2026, there were 147,437 examinees with 18,350 passing the test corresponding to 12.44% of all test-takers.

== Oblation Scholars ==
U.P. Oblation Scholars are the top 50 qualifiers for the UPCAT. Their scholarships, should they choose to enter UP, include a 100% discount on tuition fees, transportation and book allowances, and monthly stipends.

Among the Oblation Scholars who decide to enroll in UP, several are chosen to give a welcome address during the freshman assembly at the UP Theater.

== Exception ==
There were two persons admitted to UP without taking the UPCAT. One of them is Mikaela Fudolig.
