= Umali (surname) =

Umali is a Filipino surname. Notable people with the surname include:

- Alfonso Umali Jr. (born 1955), Filipino politician and architect
- Aurelio Umali (born 1966), Filipino lawyer and politician
- Bianca Umali (born 2000), Filipina actress, model and dancer
- Czarina Umali (born 1972), Filipino politician and businesswoman
- Dioscoro L. Umali (1917–1992), Filipino scientist
- Marie-Ann Umali, Filipina beauty pageant contestant
- Mariz Umali (born 1980), Filipina television news anchor and journalist
- Reynaldo Umali (1957–2021), Filipino politician
- Tonisito Umali (born 1970), Filipino government official
