= Wikipedia philosophy phenomenon =

Wikipedia linking tendency

2013 crawl on Wikipedia, from the randomly chosen article "J/22" to "Philosophy"

The Wikipedia philosophy phenomenon, sometimes called the "Philosophy Game", is the tendency that clicking the first hyperlink in the main text of an English Wikipedia article, and then repeating the process for subsequent articles, usually leads to the "Philosophy" article.

== History and explanation ==
The phenomenon was discovered in 2008 by a teenage Wikipedian named Mark J. Another Wikipedian investigated it further, and found that almost 97% of articles led to "Philosophy" at the time. A Wikipedia page on the phenomenon stated that following the chain requires clicking on "non-parenthesized, non-italicized link[s]" while ignoring external links and links to pages that do not yet exist (known as red links).

In a strip of Randall Munroe's webcomic xkcd, a tooltip mentioned the phenomenon as a "fun fact". This popularised the phenomenon, and led the University of Vermont researchers Mark Ibrahim, Christopher Danforth, and Peter Sheridan Dodds to publish a paper on the matter. They found that the first link generalises the topic and eventually leads to "Philosophy":

So while a great many [first link] paths flow to "Philosophy" [...], the accumulation is not the result of many articles directly referencing "Philosophy." Instead, first links flow towards "Philosophy" as the ultimate anchor, by generalizing from specific to broad.

Wikipedia editors had previously theorised that this was the case. According to The Guardian, editors had suspected that since articles are introduced "by building an early link to a wider category containing the article's subject", most articles eventually broaden out to "the widest category of all: philosophy". Most articles do not link to "Philosophy" directly, instead linking other terms, such as "United States" or "Presentation", both of which had tens of thousands of incoming hyperlinks as of 2016.

By contrast, the researchers also found that links trends gravitate towards topics that are prominent in politics and economics, such as, at the time of writing, health care. In February 2016, the phenomenon was true for 97% of all articles on Wikipedia, an increase from 94.52% (or 93%) in 2011. Tools have been developed which map links between articles to find where loops end.

== Other languages ==
Some non-English Wikipedias, like the German, French and Russian editions, also led to "Philosophy" like the English Wikipedia. Others, like the Dutch and Japanese editions, did not. As of 2017, the concepts with highest centrality to first link networks in European language Wikipedias are sciences, such as "Psychology" for Italian Wikipedia, while East Asian languages are connected by concepts such as humans or Earth.

== See also ==
- Wiki rabbit hole – Navigating between topics while browsing wikis
- Wikiracing – Racing game of going from one Wikipedia page to another via hyperlinks
- Six degrees of separation – Concept of social inter-connectedness
- Small world network – Graph where most nodes are reachable in a small number of steps
