= Hedonometer =

Device used to gauge happiness or pleasure

A hedonometer or hedonimeter is a device used to gauge happiness or pleasure. Conceived of at least as early as 1880, the term was used in 1881 by the economist Francis Ysidro Edgeworth to describe "an ideally perfect instrument, a psychophysical machine, continually registering the height of pleasure experienced by an individual."

More recently, it has been used to refer to a tool developed by Peter Dodds and Chris Danforth to gauge the valence of various corpora, including historical State of the Union addresses, song lyrics, and online tweets and blogs. It is operated out of the University of Vermont (UVM), and has been in use since 2008. A version of the tool is available at hedonometer.org, which they call a sort of "Dow Jones Index of Happiness", and hope will be used by government officials in conjunction with other metrics as a gauge of the population's well-being.

Computer scientists trained the hedonometer to recognize the emotion behind data as tweets with sentiment analysis techniques. Danforth preferred a lexicon approach, that measures the weight of a word, due to the energy required for neural nets.

As of 2020, the hedonometer at UVM scrapes about 50 million tweets each day. Using sentiment analysis, the hedonometer takes the emotional temperature of the words published by users of various platforms.

== See also ==
- Hedonimetry
