= Roby Muhamad =

Indonesian entrepreneur and scientist (born 1975)

Roby Muhamad is an Indonesian entrepreneur and scientist best known for his work with social network dynamics. His work spans the fields of physics, psychology, and sociology.

Muhamad earned his bachelor in physics from the Bandung Institute of Technology, and he earned his doctorate in sociology from Columbia University. He current lectures at the Department of Psychology at the University of Indonesia. In 2003, Muhamad and Duncan J. Watts were part of the team which roughly confirmed Stanley Milgram's hypothesis on six degrees of separation.

Muhamad is co-owner of the location-based dating app Yogurt. He has made public calls for modernizing anti-tobacco efforts targeted at teenagers due to tobacco companies use of social media to negate teens' rational calculation of loss-benefit.
