= Matthew J. Salganik =

American sociologist (born 1976)

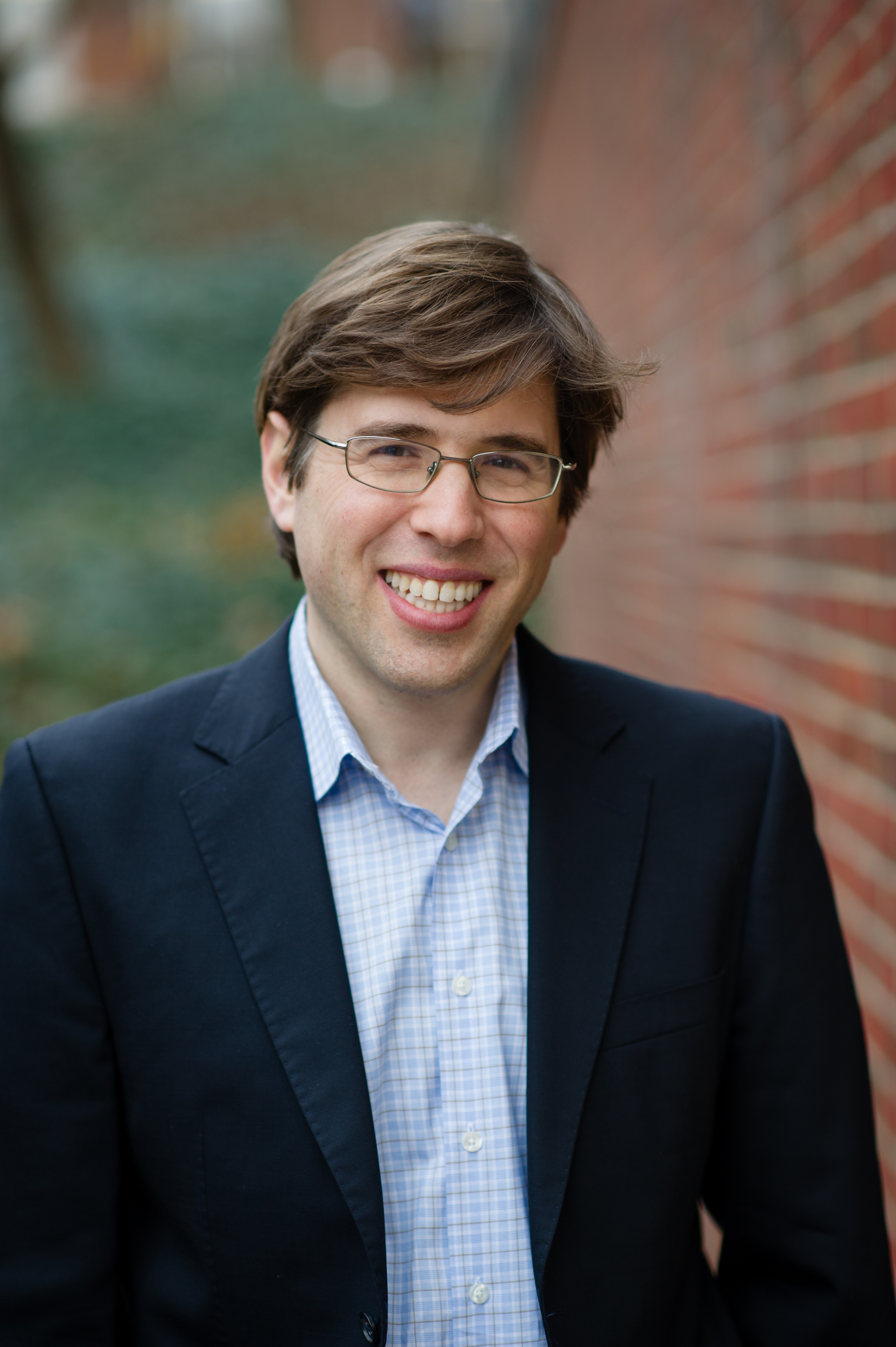
- Matthew J. Salganik
- Born: 1976 (age 49–50)
- Education: Columbia University
- Scientific career
- Fields: Sociology
- Workplaces: Princeton University
- Doctoral advisor: Duncan J. Watts

Matthew Jeffrey Salganik (born 1976) is an American sociologist and professor of sociology at Princeton University with an interest in social networks and computational social science.

== Career ==
Salganik received his bachelor's degree in mathematics at Emory University in 1998. He proceeded to get his master's degree in sociology at Cornell University in 2003, where he also lived in the Telluride House. He finished his Ph.D. in sociology (with distinction) at Columbia University in 2007. Salganik was hired by Princeton in 2007 as an assistant professor and was promoted to full professor in 2013. Alongside this, he also currently serves as the director of the Center for Information Technology Policy. Salganik is affiliated with interdisciplinary research centers at Princeton, such as the Office for Population Research, the Center for Information Technology Policy, the Center for Health and Wellbeing, and the Center for Statistics and Machine Learning. In 2017, he and Chris Bail co-founded Summer Institute in Computational Social Science (SICSS), an annual program that provides learning and research opportunities for students, faculty, and researchers across the world within the realm of data science and social science.

His research has been previously funded by the National Science Foundation, National Institutes of Health, Joint United Nations Programs for HIV/AIDS, Russell Sage Foundation, Sloan Foundation, Facebook, and Google.

=== Publications ===
Salganik published his first book Bit by Bit, on December 5, 2017, in which he explores the birth and spread of social media and other digital advancements and how this has ultimately changed the way social scientists and data scientists can conduct research to collect and process data on human behavior.

Other publications include articles in Science, PNAS, Sociological Methodology, and Journal of the American Statistical Association.

=== Awards ===
Salganik won the Outstanding Article Award from the Mathematical Sociology Section of the American Sociological Association in 2005. He won the Outstanding Statistical Application Award from the American Statistical Association in 2008.

- Outstanding Article Award (2005)
- Outstanding Statistical Application Award (2008)
- Google Faculty Research Award (2011)
- Leo Goodman Early Career Award (2015).
