= Tonisito Umali =

Filipino politician

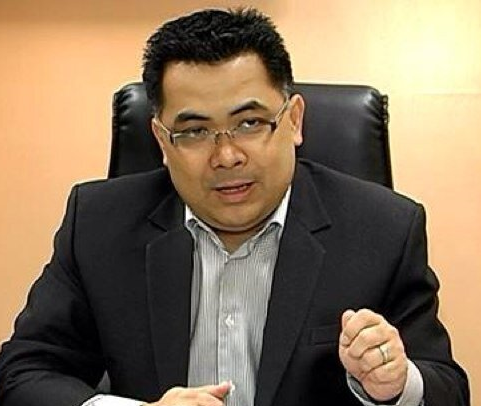

Deputy Director-General of Technical Education and Skills Development Authority
- In office September 13, 2022 – April 15, 2023
- President: Bongbong Marcos

Undersecretary for Legislative Liaison Office, External Partnerships Service and Project Management Service of Department of Education of the Philippines
- In office October 17, 2017 – July 31, 2022
- President: Rodrigo Duterte
- Preceded by: Mario Derequito

Assistant Secretary for Legal and Legislative Affairs of Department of Education of the Philippines
- In office September 10, 2010 – October 16, 2017
- President: Rodrigo Duterte; Benigno Aquino III
- Preceded by: Jonathan Malaya

Personal details
- Born: November 24, 1970 (age 55) Caloocan, Metro Manila, (Note: At the time of his birth, Caloocan was part of Rizal.) Philippines
- Education: Notre Dame of Greater Manila; Quezon City Science High School; Ateneo de Manila University; Ateneo Law School
- Profession: Lawyer

Tonisito M.C. Umali (born November 24, 1970) is a Filipino politician who is the former Deputy Director-General of Technical Education and Skills Development Authority (TESDA).

Umali was the Undersecretary for Legislative Affairs, External Partnerships, Project Management, and Private Education at the Department of Education of the Philippines, Department of Education of the Philippines' Data Protection Officer and alternate representative of the Secretary as Chairman of the PEAC (Private Education Assistance Committee). In addition, Umali was the Undersecretary for Legislative Liaison Office, External Partnerships Service and School Sports of the Department of Education of the Philippines and also the Assistant Secretary for Legal and Legislative Affairs of the Department of Education of the Philippines.

Umali is a member of the Integrated Bar of the Philippines after having obtained his Juris Doctor degree from the Ateneo de Manila University. He is also licensed to practice law in the State of California after passing the California State Bar examination, as well as the United States (Federal) District Courts of Central, Eastern and Southern California.

== Early life and education ==
Umali was born on November 24, 1970, to Antonio L. Umali and Milagros A. Casugbo in Caloocan, Philippines. He attended elementary school at Notre Dame of Greater Manila where he was an honor student, and attended high school at Quezon City Science High School where he was awarded the Gerry Roxas Leadership Award upon graduation. On September 6, 2017, at the golden anniversary of Quezon City Science High School, Umali was chosen as one of the high school's top ten Most Outstanding Alumni.

He pursued his undergraduate studies at the Ateneo de Manila University and was conferred Bachelor of Science in Legal Management in 1992. Umali pursued his Juris Doctor degree also at Ateneo Law School where he completed his studies in 1997.

Umali successfully passed the Philippine Bar Examination in 1997, the same year he graduated from law school, and took oath and was admitted to practice law on May 6, 1998. He is currently a member of the Integrated Bar of the Philippines. He was also admitted to the State Bar of California in 2004 after passing the California State Bar examination.

On April 15, 2015, Umali was conferred Doctor of Public Administration, Honoris Causa by the Polytechnic University of the Philippines.

== Law practice ==
Umali worked for a law firm prior to the establishment of his own law office with his father Antonio L. Umali in 1999.

Umali also engaged in extensive civil, criminal, administrative, local government and election law practice. He focused in local government and election law cases when he joined the law office of former Solicitor General and Secretary of the Department of Justice (Philippines), Alberto Agra.

Furthermore, Umali also worked as a legal consultant to former Philippine Senate Majority Floor Leader Loren Legarda.

In 2004, Umali furthered his law career in the United States. He was admitted to the State Bar of California in 2004 and practiced civil, family, immigration, personal injury, and bankruptcy laws in the Los Angeles county region after passing the California State Bar examination. He featured often in Filipino-targeted news publications Weekend Balita and Asian Journal, dispensing advice to fellow countrymen living in the United States.

== Academic career ==
Umali is a part-time lecturer at the graduate program of University of the Philippines, National College of Public Administration and Governance (UP-NCPAG) and at the Polytechnic University of the Philippines (PUP), Master in Educational Management (MEM) and Doctor in Educational Management (DEM). He was a part-time lecturer and member of the faculty of the College of Economics and Politics of the Polytechnic University of the Philippines (PUP) while serving as legal consultant to some local chief executives, the League of Municipalities of the Philippines (LMP) and the Office of Senator Loren Legarda. He was also a former law professor at the Law School of the Universidad de Manila, teaching Constitutional Law 1 and 2.

Umali is a Career Executive Service Officer (CESO I) as of March 2022. He was initially CESO II after having passed and completed the CESO eligibility process in 2013. He was elected as the President of the Philippine Educators Association of CESOs and Eligibles (PEACE), Inc. and during the PEACE, Inc. second general assembly held in Ecotech Center, Lahug, Cebu City on November 10–12, 2014, he was elected as the President of the Board of National Union of Career Executive Service Officers (NUCESO) . Umali is also a National Chess Federation of the Philippines (NCFP) Director/Chairman of the Youth Committee.

== Department of Education ==
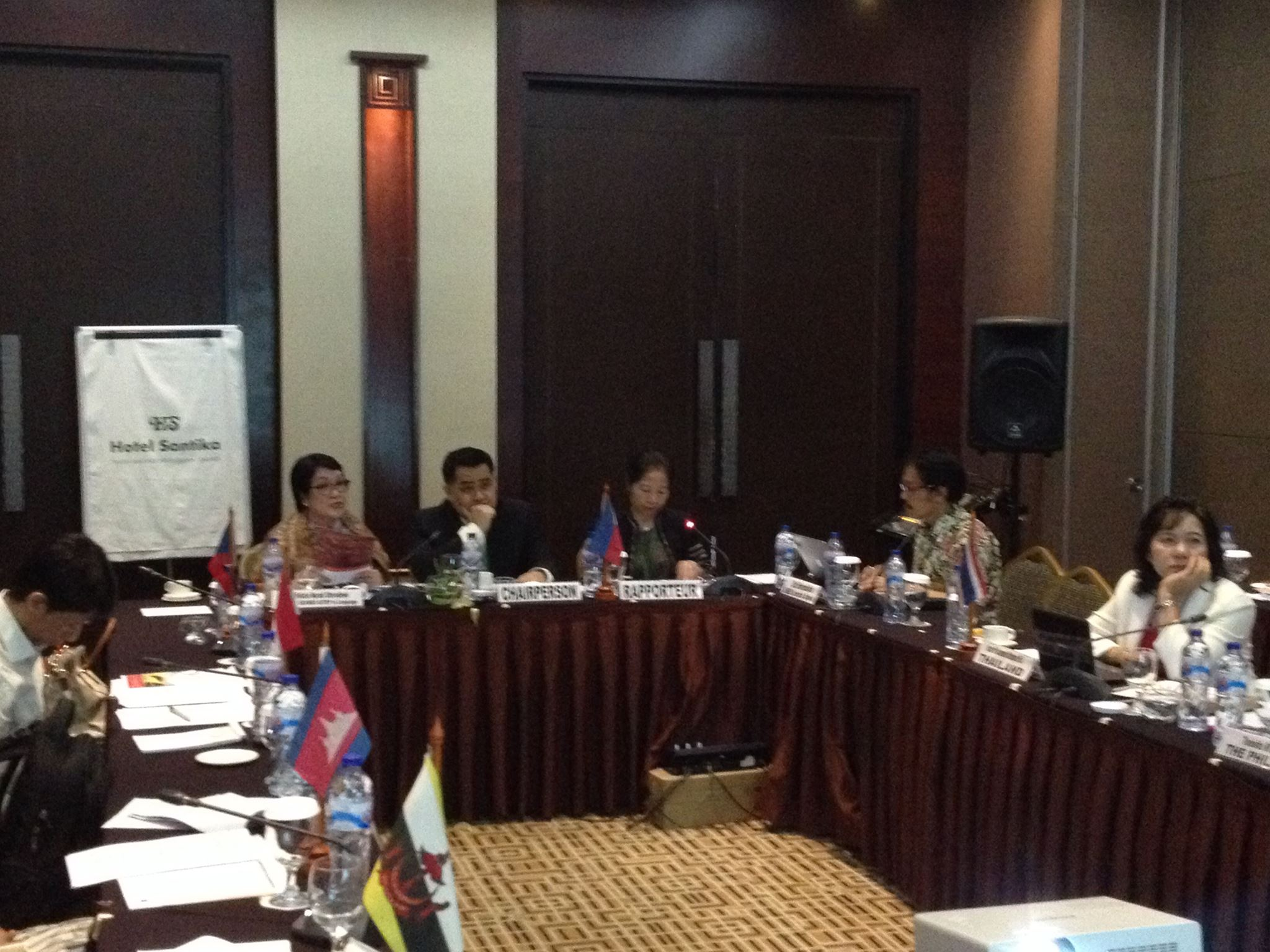
Seated in the middle, Philippine Department of Education's Tonisito Umali, elected as Chairperson by the ASEAN member countries of Seameo Qitep in Language to preside its 5th Governing Board meeting held last Oct 6 to 10, 2014 at Jakarta, Indonesia.

In joining the Department of Education, Umali brought with him a wealth of experience in drafting proposed legislative measures for both chamber of Congress, engaging in litigation practice, preparing court pleadings, providing legal opinions, doing research on legal matters and many more.

He started his career in the department as the Assistant Secretary for Legal and Legislative Affairs on September 20, 2010, and on October 17, 2017, was appointed to Undersecretary for Legislative Liaison Office, External Partnerships Service and School Sports. He is now the Undersecretary for Legislative Affairs, External Partnerships, Project Management Service, and Private Education.

Umali, representing the Department of Education (Philippines), was a member of the governing board of Southeast Asian Ministers of Education Organization (SEAMEO) Quality Improvement of Teachers and Education Personnel (QITEP) in Language in Jakarta, Indonesia. He is currently a member of the Development Academy of the Philippines (DAP) Board as representative of the Department of Education. Umali is also the Department of Education alternate representative to the Private Education Assistance Committee (PEAC) and as such, he is presiding all regular and special PEAC Board meetings on behalf of the DepEd Secretary.

As one of the former spokespersons of the Department of Education, he led the information campaign on basic education programs and projects and shed light on various issues and concerns confronting the Department.

On May 5, 2022, Umali was designated by the Department of Education of the Philippines as the Department's Data Protection Officer.

=== K+12 Basic Education Program ===
As Department of Education Assistant Secretary for Legal and Legislative Affairs, he was instrumental in the passage of Republic Act No. 10533 or the Enhanced Basic Education Act of 2013 also popularly known as the K to 12 Program and its Implementing Rules and Regulation (IRR). He served as the Chairperson of a Committee in charge of the transition issues on the implementation of said K to 12 law particularly on the law’s effects to private basic education schools and Higher Education Institutions (HEIs). He has been active in the legislative and budget process in coordination with the members of Congress and local chief executives of the various local government units.

=== Anti-Bullying Act of 2013 ===
Umali was invited during Senate and House of Representative committee hearings as a resource speaker and was thus instrumental in the passage of Republic Act No. 10627, otherwise known as the Anti-Bullying Act of 2013.

=== Palarong Pambansa ===
Umali was the Officer-in-Charge of the after school sports program of the Department wherein he introduced significant reforms on systems and procedures towards professionalism, fairness and transparency in the conduct of sports events. He is also the former Secretary-General of the Philippine Palarong Pambansa. Umali was instrumental in the passage of Republic Act No. 10588 or Palarong Pambansa Act Of 2013 and its Implementing Rules and Regulations (IRR).

=== Other Education-Related Laws ===
Umali was invited during Senate and House of Representative committee hearings as a resource speaker and was thus instrumental in the passage of Republic Act Nos. 11476 (Good Manners and Right Conduct (GMRC) and Values Education Act); and 11510 (Alternative Learning Systems Act). Umali also headed the technical working committee which drafted the implementing rules and regulations of said laws.

=== Brigada Eskwela and Brigada Pagbasa ===
As Department of Education Undersecretary in charge of Partnerships, Umali is the lead education official in charge of Brigada Eskwela or National School Maintenance Week. Brigada Eskwela is the Department of Education's main program in addressing resource gaps or needs of the public schools by engaging private stakeholders, local government units and other government agencies. One of the legal bases for the implementation of Brigada Eskwela is Republic Act No. 8525 (Adopt-a-School Act of 1998). Under Umali's leadership, the amount of resources generated through this program to help public schools was more than doubled compared to the amounts raised in 2015.

In response to the call to intensify the advocacy for reading under the Hamon: Bawat Bata Bumabasa (3Bs Initiatives) issued under DepEd Memorandum No. 173, s. 2019, the DepEd External Partnerships Service (EPS), under the leadership of Umali, has committed to make every learner a reader by engaging partners and stakeholders to promote the culture of reading.

Together with DepEd's partner World Vision Development Foundation, DepEd EPS, under the leadership of Umali, developed and implemented the Brigada Pagbasa program. Brigada Pagbasa, as a form of Brigada Eskwela, is an after-school reading program that envisions bringing together education partners and experts to help learners read and become functionally literate.

Brigada Pagbasa intends to cater to learners who are below 18 years old, including those who are under the Alternative Learning System (ALS), focusing on non-readers and struggling readers from both formal and non-formal education systems nationwide.

== TEDSA (Technical Education and Skills Development Authority) ==
On September 13, 2022, Umali was appointed Deputy Director-General at TEDSA (Technical Education and Skills Development Authority).

== Publication and radio ==
Umali was a regular contributor to Philippine news publications Bulgar and Business Mirror and appeared regularly on radio station DZXL 558 Radyo Mo Nationwide as a guest of Audrey Hidalgo on the radio show Markado from 2012 to 2014. He was also a regular guest of radio station DZRH's program "Barangay RH" with former Congressman Angelo Palmones. Umali is currently the host of the radio program "Eduk-Aksyon" in DZEC-AM Radyo Agila.

== Awards and recognition ==
- On April 12, 2019, at the Senior High School Year-End Commencement Exercises held at the Filoil Flying V Centre in San Juan, Metro Manila, Umali was awarded the Tanglaw ng Bayan Award by the Polytechnic University of the Philippines (PUP) for his outstanding leadership that contributed to the development of the Department of Education of the Philippines as an institution of excellence. The Tanglaw ng Bayan Award is the highest award of recognition bestowed by PUP on individuals who have outstanding achievements and have made significant contributions to society.
- On the July 29, 2018, publication of the newspaper The Philippine Star, on the occasion of their 32nd anniversary, Umali was featured as one of the accomplished and notable Filipinos in their profession best representing the Filipino of today under the theme "The Filipino Now".
- On November 13, 2014, at the Palacio Arzobispal, Intramuros, Manila, Umali was awarded by Radio Veritas Broadcasting System Inc., on the occasion of their 45th (Sapphire) Anniversary, a Plaque of Recognition in appreciation of his generous partnership and valuable contribution in supporting the social communications ministry for truth and evangelization.
