= Chris Danforth =

American computer scientist and professor

Christopher McLaughlin Danforth
- Known for: Hedonometer; Sentiment analysis Mental health detection research Computational Story Lab
- Scientific career
- Fields: Computer Science; Applied Mathematics; Computational Social Science; Complex Systems
- Workplaces: University of Vermont
- Website: www.uvm.edu/~cdanfort/

Christopher McLaughlin Danforth is an American computer scientist and professor of applied mathematics at the University of Vermont. He is known for his work in computational social science, particularly for developing the Hedonometer, a tool for measuring collective mood and happiness using sentiment analysis of social media data.

Danforth co-directs the Computational Story Lab at the Vermont Complex Systems Institute with Peter Sheridan Dodds, where he leads research on large-scale sociotechnical systems, exploring human behavior through analysis of social media and other digital data sources.

== Education and career ==
Danforth earned his Ph.D. in applied mathematics, with early research focused on numerical weather prediction and applications of chaos theory to improve weather forecasts. He holds the position of Professor in the Department of Mathematics and Statistics at the University of Vermont and serves as Associate Director of the Vermont Complex Systems Institute.

Danforth is also affiliated with the Vermont Advanced Computing Center, where he leads computational infrastructure development for research in artificial intelligence and complex systems.

== Research ==
=== Hedonometer and sentiment analysis ===
In 2007, Danforth collaborated with Peter Sheridan Dodds to develop the Hedonometer, an instrument designed to measure happiness and emotional states in large populations through analysis of social media text. The project involved surveying native speakers of multiple languages to rate words on a happiness scale, creating a weighted dictionary of emotional valence for approximately 10,000 words in ten languages.

The Hedonometer measures real-time emotional trends by analyzing text from Twitter and other social media platforms. Research using the tool has examined emotional responses to major events, geographical variations in happiness, and temporal patterns in collective mood. Studies have documented applications in analyzing events such as the Ferguson protests, where the tool identified significant shifts in word usage patterns reflecting community sentiment.

=== Mental health detection ===
Danforth's research has explored the use of social media data for early detection of mental health conditions. In collaboration with psychologist Andrew Reece of Harvard University, he conducted a 2017 study analyzing Instagram photographs to identify markers of depression. The research examined 43,950 photos from 166 participants and used machine learning to analyze features including color composition, brightness, filter usage, and face detection.

The study found that photographs posted by individuals with depression tended to be bluer, darker, and grayer in color compared to those posted by non-depressed individuals. The computational model achieved a 70% accuracy rate in identifying depression, outperforming the average 42% diagnostic success rate of general practitioners in unassisted depression diagnosis. Notably, the model could detect signs of depression in photographs posted before individuals received clinical diagnoses, suggesting potential for early screening applications.

=== Other research contributions ===
Danforth's work spans multiple areas of computational science and complex systems. He has published research on:

- Applications of chaos theory to numerical weather prediction and climate modeling.
- Analysis of information spreading and social contagion in online networks
- Computational approaches to understanding narrative structure and storytelling.
- The "Wikipedia philosophy phenomenon", where following the first link in Wikipedia articles often leads to the Philosophy article.

== Computational Story Lab ==
Danforth co-directs the Computational Story Lab with Peter Sheridan Dodds, a research group focused on large-scale, system-level problems across sociology, nonlinear dynamics, networks, ecology, and physics. The lab's research combines observational data, mathematical models, and computational simulations to understand complex phenomena.

The lab has developed several tools and datasets for the research community, including:

- Hedonometer: A public website providing real-time happiness measurements from Twitter data
- StoryWrangler: A platform for analyzing phrase popularity across 150 billion tweets

== Funding and support ==
Danforth's research has been supported by multiple organizations, including the National Science Foundation, the National Institutes of Health, the James S. McDonnell Foundation, the Office of Naval Research, NASA, and MITRE Corporation.

In 2023, as part of a group of researchers in the Vermont Complex Systems Institute, he helped procure a National Science Foundation award to study the science of stories. This 5-year grant was called The Science of Online Corpora, Knowledge, and Stories (SOCKS).

In 2025, Danforth led a team that received a $2.1 million grant from the National Science Foundation to create IceCore, a high-performance computing cluster for artificial intelligence research. The system is designed to support approximately 1,000 researchers across Vermont and New England studying topics including infectious diseases, computational social science, and large language models.

== Teaching ==
At the University of Vermont, Danforth teaches courses in applied mathematics, including linear algebra, numerical analysis, nonlinear dynamics, ordinary differential equations, and data ethics. He has developed video lecture series on nonlinear dynamics that are freely available online.

== Publications ==
According to Google Scholar, Danforth's work has been cited over 10,700 times. His most highly cited works include research on temporal patterns of happiness in social networks, the universal positivity bias in human language, and computational methods for mental health screening.

=== Selected publications ===
- Peter Sheridan Dodds; Kameron Decker Harris; Isabel M. Kloumann; Catherine A. Bliss; Christopher M. Danforth (2011). "Temporal Patterns of Happiness and Information in a Global Social Network: Hedonometrics and Twitter". PLOS ONE. 6 (12) e26752. Bibcode:2011PLoSO...626752D. doi:10.1371/journal.pone.0026752. PMC 3233600. PMID 22163266.
- Andrew G. Reece; Christopher M. Danforth (2017). "Instagram photos reveal predictive markers of depression". EPJ Data Science. 6 (1): 15. arXiv:1608.03282. doi:10.1140/epjds/s13688-017-0110-z. hdl:20.500.14849/591.
- Peter Sheridan Dodds; Eric M. Clark; Suma Desu; Morgan R. Frank; Andrew J. Reagan; et al. (2015). "Human language reveals a universal positivity bias". Proceedings of the National Academy of Sciences. 112 (8): 2389–2394. Bibcode:2015PNAS..112.2389D. doi:10.1073/pnas.1411678112. PMC 4345622.
