= Stan Augarten =

American historian

Stan Augarten is an American writer on the history of computing.

== Life ==
Stan Augarten received his M.A. in American History at Columbia University. He has worked as an employee at Steve Jobs's company NeXT. Since 2002 he has lived in Paris, France.

== Works ==
He is the author of two books:

- State of the Art: A Photographic History of the Integrated Circuit, 1983
- Bit by Bit: An Illustrated History of Computers, 1984. Internet Archive
- Bit by Bit: An Illustrated History of Computers, 1984. OCR with permission of the author
