= Umali, India =

Village in Maharashtra, India

Umali
- Village
- Location in Maharashtra Umali (India)
- Coordinates: 20.8917°N 76.2047°E
- Country: India
- State: Maharashtra
- District: Buldhana

Government
  - Type: Panchayat
- Elevation: 252 m (827 ft)

Population (2011)
  - Total: 4,373

Languages
  - Official: Marathi, Varhadi
- Time zone: UTC+5:30 (IST)
- PIN: 443102
- Telephone code: 07267
- Vehicle registration: MH 28
- Sex ratio: 1.04 ♂/♀
- Literacy: 76.1%

Umali is a village in Malkapur tehsil of Buldhana district in Maharashtra, India. Nearby towns are Malkapur on west, Nandura on East. Village has a highschool Adarsh Vidyalay and a district sub hospital. There is also a Zilla Parishad High School. The village had a population of 4,373 in 2011.
