= List of Ace of Diamond chapters =

Ace of Diamond is a baseball-themed manga series written and illustrated by Yuji Terajima. The series ran in Kodansha's shōnen manga magazine Weekly Shōnen Magazine from May 2006 to July 2015. The chapters were collected and published in tankōbon format by Kodansha. A total of 47 volumes was published for the series. Kodansha USA has licensed the series for an English digital release under the title Ace of the Diamond. The first English digital volume was released on 7 March 2017. As of 9 January 2024, 47 volumes have been released in English.

A sequel manga, Ace of Diamond act II, was serialized in the same magazine from 19 August 2015, to 26 October 2022. The chapters are also collected and published in tankōbon by Kodansha. As of 17 May 2023, 34 volumes have been released in Japan.

== Volumes ==
=== Act I ===
| No. | Original release date | Original ISBN | North American release date | North American ISBN |
|---|---|---|---|---|
| 1 | 15 September 2006 | 978-4-06-363728-1 | 7 March 2017 | 978-1-68-233604-5 |
001. "The Pitch of Destiny" (運命の一球, Unmei no ichikyū); 002. "Partner" (相棒, Aibō); 003. "The Day Our Journey Begins" (旅立ちの日, Tabidachi no hi); 004. "You've Got Guts" (いい度胸だな, Ī dokyōda na); 005. "Speak With Your Skill" (才能で語れ, Chikara de katare)
| 2 | 17 October 2006 | 978-4-06-363739-7 | 11 April 2017 | 978-1-68-233654-0 |
006. "Not Qualified To Be A Pitcher" (投手失格, Tōshu shikkaku); 007. "Just You Wait!" (待ってろよ！, Mattero yo!); 008. "Are You Like Me?" (同じタイプ？, Onaji taipu?); 009. "An Awkward Moment" (気まずい時間; Kimazui jikan); 010. "A Clash" (激突, Gekitotsu); 011. "The Third-Years' Pride" (三年生の意地, San'nensei no puraido); 012. "Not Yet!" (まだだ, Madada!); 013. "I'm A Pinch Hitter!" (代打オレ！, Daida ore!)
| 3 | 15 December 2006 | 978-4-06-363767-0 | 9 May 2017 | 978-1-68-233673-1 |
014. "The New Ace" (真のエース, Shin no ēsu); 015. "Counterattack" (逆襲, Gyakushū); 016. "Curve The Power Batter" (ムービング対パワー, Mūbingu tai pawā); 017. "Two Months Till Summer" (なつまで2か月, Natsu made nikagetsu); 018. "The Difficult Climb To The Top" (日本一の山, Nihon'ichi no yama); 019. "Our Three Years" (俺達の3年間, Oretachi no san-nenkan); 020. "The Monster's Debut" (怪物デビュー, Kaibutsu debyū); 021. "The Big Idiot" (大バカヤロオ, Ō baka yaroo); 022. "A Catcher's Duty" (捕手の役目, Hoshu no yakume)
| 4 | 16 February 2007 | 978-4-06-363796-0 | 13 June 2017 | 978-1-68-233705-9 |
023. "Selling Point" (セールスポイント, Sērusu pointo); 024. "Onto That Mound" (あのマウンドへ, Ano maundo e); 025. "Hone The Moving Fastball" (クセ球を磨け, Kuse dama o migake); 026. "As If We'd Quit Now?!" (今さら辞めるれるかよ!, Imasara yameru reru ka yo!); 027. "A Flash Of Genius" (大器の片鱗, Taiki no henrin); 028. "I'll Be Waiting" (待ってるぞ, Matteru zo); 029. "A Clever Plan" (奇策, Kisaku); 030. "The Three Catchers" (3人の捕手(キャッチャー), Sannin no kyatchā); 031. "The Last Regular Game" (最後の公式戦, Saigo no kōshiki-sen)
| 5 | 17 April 2011 | 978-4-06-363821-9 | 3 October 2017 | 978-1-68-233883-4 |
032. "A Batter's Skill" (打者の力量, Dasha no riki ryō); 033. "Requiem" (引導, Indō); 034. "The Bond Between Teacher and Student" (師弟の絆, Shitei no kizuna); 035. "Toward That Number" (あの背番号に, Ano sebangō ni); 036. "Conclusion, And Then" (決着、そして, Ketchaku, soshite); 037. "Become Stronger" (強くなれ, Tsuyokunare); 038. "Have You Changed?" (変わった？, Kawatta?); 039. "On A Rainy Day" (雨の日に, Ame no hi ni); 040. "Training Camp Begins" (合宿スタート, Gasshuku sutāto)
| 6 | 17 July 2007 | 978-4-06-363856-1 | 7 November 2017 | 978-1-68-233963-3 |
041. "It Starts from Your Legs and Hips" (まずは足腰から, Mazuwa ashi koshi kara); 042. "Egotist" (エゴイスト, Egoisuto); 043. "Lead Them With Your Playing!!" (プレーで引っ張れ！！, Purē de hippare!!); 044. "Trials" (試練, Shiren); 045. "The Golden Child" (秘蔵っ子, Hizokko); 046. "What Does Trust Mean?" (信頼って？, Shinrai tte?); 047. "Games are Fun" (試合は楽しい, Gēmu wa tanoshī); 048. "Miracle Pitch" (魔球, Makyū); Extra Chapter. "Kazuya Miyuki" (御幸一也, Miyuki Kazuya)
| 7 | 14 September 2007 | 978-4-06-363889-9 | 2 January 2018 | 978-1-64-212076-9 |
049. "Test" (試験, Shiken); 050. "Chris's Legacy" (クリス直伝, Kurisu jikiden); 051. "Fluttering" (ひょうひょうと, Hyōhyōto); 052. "Pissed Off..." (ムカツクけど・・・・, Mukatsuku kedo); 053. "Review Session" (反省会, Hansei kai); 054. "Fate" (因縁, Innen); 055. "Witness" (目撃, Mokugeki); 056. "Better than the Rumours" (評判以上, Hyōban ijō); 057. "Gears" (歯車, Haguruma)
| 8 | 16 November 2007 | 978-4-06-363913-1 | 6 February 2018 | 978-1-64-212089-9 |
058. "State of Emergency" (緊急事態, Kinkyū jitai); 059. "First-Year Representative" (一年代表, Ichinen daihyō); 060. "Faithful Heart" (信じる心, Shinjiru kokoro); 061. "Toward the Field of Dreams" (夢の舞台へ, Yume no butai e); 062. "First-Game Opponent" (初戦の相手, Shosen no aite); 063. "Carelessness is the Great Enemy" (油断大敵, Yudantaiteki); 064. "That Guy's Got a Strong Arm" (その男剛腕につき, Sono otoko gōwan ni tsuki); 065. "Time To Show Off" (アピールタイム, Apīrutaimu); 066. "Tournament Debut" (公式戦デビュー, Kōshiki-sen debyū)
| 9 | 15 February 2008 | 978-4-06-363951-3 | 6 March 2018 | 978-1-64-212150-6 |
067. "Road" (ロード, Rōdo); 068. "Starting March?!" (快進撃！？, Kaishingeki!?); 069. "Precision Instrument" (精密機械, Seimitsu kikai); 070. "It's Summer, Right?" (夏なんだな, Natsuna ndana); 071. "Across the Sea" (海を渡って, Umi o watatte); 072. "You Scared?" (ビビってんのか?, Bibitten no ka?); 073. "March for Match Four" (四回戦開戦, Yonkaisen kaisen); 074. "Furuya Strategy Guide" (降谷攻略, Furuya kōryaku); 075. "ALIVE"; Extra Chapter. "Upperclassmen and Underclassmen" (先輩と後輩, Senpai to kōhai)
| 10 | 17 April 2008 | 978-4-06-363973-5 | 3 April 2018 | 978-1-64-212181-0 |
076. "Spark" (スパーク, Supāku); 077. "Judge" (ジャッジ, Jajji); 078. "Miracle Akikawa" (ミラクル明川, Mirakuru Akikawa); 079. "Don't Want to Get Down" (降りたくない, Oritakunai); 080. "Relief" (リリーフ, Rirīfu); 081. "I'm Not Runnin'" (逃げねえぞ, Nigenē zo); 082. "Turning the Tide" (反撃の狼煙, Hangeki no noroshi); 083. "In Sync" (シンクロ, Shinkuro); 084. "The Best Summer" (最高の夏, Saikō no natsu)
| 11 | 17 July 2008 | 978-4-06-384012-4 | 22 May 2018 | 978-1-64-212239-8 |
085. "Unnoticed" (ノーマーク, Nōmāku); 086. "Explosive Trigger" (起爆剤, Kibaku-zai); 087. "Run Run Run"; 088. "Winner and Loser" (勝者と敗者, Shōsha to haisha); 089. "Who Will It Be Tomorrow?" (明日はどっちだ!!, Ashita ha docchi da!!); 090. "Dark Horse" (ダークホース, Dāku hōsu); 091. "Get Outta My Way" (邪魔すんじゃねぇ, Jama sun janē); 092. "It's Waiting" (待ってたんだよ, Matteta nda yo); 093. "The Best Summer" (それぞれの夏, Sorezore no natsu)
| 12 | 17 September 2008 | 978-4-06-384040-7 | 26 June 2018 | 978-1-64-212276-3 |
094. "Recapture The Feeling" (実践感覚を取り戻せ, Jissen kankaku o torimodose); 095. "Money Tree" (金のなる木, Kane no naruki); 096. "Three Pitchers + The Ace" (三投手+エース, San tōshu + ēsu); 097. "Preparations for War" (臨戦態勢, Rinsen taisei); 098. "The Moment of Impact?" (出会い頭？, Deai ga shira?); 099. "Reliable Upperclassmen" (頼れる先輩達, Tayoreru senpai-tachi); 100. "Growth" (成長, Seichō); 101. "Glove" (グローブ, Gurōbu); 102. "Potential" (ポテンシャル, Potensharu)
| 13 | 17 November 2008 | 978-4-06-384064-3 | 24 July 2018 | 978-1-64-212277-0 |
103. "Head-to-Head Fight" (真向勝負, Makkō shōbu); 104. "Ace Takes the Stage" (エース登場, Ēsu tōjō); 105. "Cutter" (カッター, Kattā); 106. "Keep Moving Forward" (前進あるのみ, Zenshin aru nomi); 107. "Yesterday And Today" (昨日 今日の・・・・, Kinō kyō no); 108. "Responsibility" (責任感, Sekinin-kan); 109. "BURST"; 110. "Dark Clouds" (暗雲, An'un); 111. "Seesawing" (一進一退, Isshin ittai)
| 14 | 14 February 2009 | 978-4-06-384097-1 | 28 August 2018 | 978-1-64-212307-4 |
112. "Their Respective Parts" (それぞれ役割, Sorezore yakuwari); 113. "Give and Take" (応酬, Ōshū); 114. "The First Pitch" (初球, Shokyū); 115. "Self-Awareness" (自覚, Jikaku); 116. "Shouldering Expectations" (期待を背負って, Kitai o seotte); 117. "Until the Time is Right" (満を持して, Man o jishite); 118. "Ace in the Hole" (切り札, Kirifuda); 119. "Last Pitch" (ラストボール, Rasutobōru); 120. "Facing Tomorrow" (明日に向かって, Ashita ni mukatte)
| 15 | 17 April 2009 | 978-4-06-384121-3 | 25 September 2018 | 978-1-64-212418-7 |
121. "It's Not Like You" (らしくねぇな？, Rashikunee na?); 122. "Spark" (火花, Hibana); 123. "Hope There's No Screw-ups" (凡ミスの無いように・・・・, Bon misu no nai yō ni); 124. "Can't Trust Ya" (信用せえへん, Shin'yō se ehen); 125. "Reliable" (堅実, Kenjitsu); 126. "Omen" (兆候, Chōkō); 127. "Aggressive" (アグレッシブ, Aguresshibu); 128. "Lucky Boy" (ラッキーボーイ, Rakkī bōi); 129. "Revenge" (リベンジ, Ribenji)
| 16 | 17 June 2009 | 978-4-06-384147-3 | 23 October 2018 | 978-1-64-212461-3 |
130. "Unshakeable" (揺るぎなく, Yuruginaku); 131. "Invisible Wall" (見えない壁, Mienai kabe); 132. "Winning Pitch" (決め球, Kime dama); 133. "Not Yet" (まだまだや・・・・, Madamada ya); 134. "The Favorite" (本命, Honmei); 135. "Pipe Dream" (夢物語, Yume monogatari); 136. "Wisdom of the Mound" (マウンドの心得, Maundo no kokoroe); 137. "Inimitale Perseverence" (堅忍不抜, Kennin fubatsu); 138. "Sakura Wilts" (サクラチル・・・・, Sakura chiru)
| 17 | 17 August 2009 | 978-4-06-384172-5 | 27 November 2018 | 978-1-64-212462-0 |
139. "What Lies Beyond" (その先にあるもの・・・・, Sono saki ni aru mono); 140. "Fuse" (導火線, Dōka sen); 141. "At the Dorm" (寮にて・・・・, Ryō ni te); 142. "Reason" (理由, Riyū); 143. "Declaration of Intent" (決意表明, Ketsui hyōmei); 144. "A Familiar Face" (懐顔, Natsukashī kao); 145. "Degree of Completion" (完成度, Kansei-do); 146. "Our Tomorrow" (俺達の明日, Oretachi no ashita); 147. "Footprints to the Future" (明日への足跡, Ashita e no ashi ato)
| 18 | 17 November 2009 | 978-4-06-384210-4 | 25 December 2018 | 978-1-64-212503-0 |
148. "The Night Before" (前夜, Zenya); 149. "Line Up" (並び立つ, Narabitatsu); 150. "Mobility" (機動力, Kidōryoku); 151. "Sucker Punch" (先制パンチ, Sensei panchi); 152. "The Pitch I was After" (狙い球, Nerai dama); 153. "Storm" (ストーム, Sutōmu); 154. "Crackling" (バッチバチ, Batchi batchi); 155. "Changing Gears" (ギアチェンジ, Gia chenji); 156. "MGP"
| 19 | 15 January 2010 | 978-4-06-384232-6 | 22 January 2019 | 978-1-64-212605-1 |
157. "As the Clean-up" (4番として, Yonban toshite); 158. "Frustrated, Huh?" (くやしいか？, Kuyashī ka?); 159. "Baton" (バトン, Baton); 160. "Lifeline" (生命線, Seimei-sen); 161. "Retrospection" (回顧, Kaiko); 162. "Light" (光・・・・, Hikari); 163. "Irritation" (苛立ち, Iradachi); 164. "Between Shortstop and Second" (二遊間の・・・・, Niyūkan no); 165. "Bit-by-Bit" (ジワジワと, Jiwajiwa to)
| 20 | 17 March 2010 | 978-4-06-384265-4 | 26 February 2019 | 978-1-64-212626-6 |
166. "Limit" (リミット, Rimitto); 167. "One More Time" (もう一度・・・・, Mōichido); 168. "Which One?" (どっちなんだよ, Docchinanda yo); 169. "Resolve" (決断, Ketsudan); 170. "Opportunity Knocks" (好機到来, Chansu tōrai); 171. "The Underclassmen" (後輩達, Kōhai-tachi); 172. "Hero" (ヒーロー, Hīrō); 173. "The Man Who Hits Forward" (前を打つ男, Mae o utsu otoko); 174. "Stubbornness and Pride" (意地とか誇りとか, Iji to ka hokori to ka)
| 21 | 17 May 2010 | 978-4-06-384295-1 | 26 March 2019 | 978-1-64-212695-2 |
175. "From Here on Out" (その先に・・・・, Sono saki ni); 176. "I Don't Remember" (覚えてない・・, Oboetenai); 177. "Unstable Point" (不安要素, Fuan yōso); 178. "Not Afraid of Anything" (怖いもの知らず, Kowaimono shirazu); 179. "Fever and Force" (熱と勢い, Netsu to ikioi); 180. "The Lonely Sun" (孤独な太陽, Kodoku na taiyō); 181. "At a Standstill" (止まったまま, Tomatta mama); 182. "Final Battle" (最終決戦, Saishū kessen); 183. "Persistence" (執念, Shūnen)
| 22 | 17 August 2010 | 978-4-06-384345-3 | 23 April 2019 | 978-1-64-212785-0 |
184. "Countdown" (カウントダウン, Kauntodaun); 185. "Roar" (咆哮, Hōkō); 186. "Aftermath" (余波, Yoha); 187. "Crossroads" (別れ道, Wakare michi); 188. "Crunch Time" (天王山, Ten'nōzan); 189. "cross"; 190. "With Delight" (歓喜と・・・・, Kankito); 191. "Echo" (残響, Zankyō); 192. "Real Feeling" (実感, Jikkan)
| 23 | 15 October 2010 | 978-4-06-384378-1 | 13 August 2019 | 978-1-64-212981-6 |
193: "Our Generation" (俺達の代, Oretachi no dai); 194: "Proclamation" (宣言, Sengen); 195: "The Next Captain" (次期キャプテン, Jiki kyaputen); 196: "Restart" (リスタート, Risutāto); 197: "Duty and Obligation" (責任と使命, Sekinin to shimei); 198: "With All Our Expectations" (期待を込めて, Kitai o komete); 199: "A Sunny Place" (日の当たる場所; Hi no ataru basho); 200: "Gotta Get Serious" (本気じゃなきゃ, Honki janakya); 201: "I Dunno" (知らねーよ, Shiranee yo)
| 24 | 17 December 2010 | 978-4-06-384415-3 | 14 January 2020 | 978-1-64-659205-0 |
202: "To the Top" (頂点へ, Chōten e); 203: "Outsider" (よそ者, Yosomono); 204: "Behind Closed Doors" (水面下, Suimenka); 205: "The Missing Piece" (足りない何か, Tarinai nanika); 206: "Inspiration" (発奮材料, Happun zairyō); 207: "A Greeting" (ごあいさつ, Go aisatsu); 208: "In Front of Third" (サードの前, Sādo no mae); 209: "Monster's Request" (怪物の要望, Kaibutsu no yōbō); 210: "Stairway" (階段, Kaidan)
| 25 | 17 March 2011 | 978-4-06-384458-0 | 31 March 2020 | 978-1-64-659275-3 |
211: "Ability" (アビリティ, Abiriti); 212: "A Question of Merit" (真価を問, Shinka o tou); 213: "Going Wild" (暴れだす, Abaredasu); 214: "A Kid with Lots of Spunk" (気の強いのがもう一匹, Ki no tsuyoi no ga mō itsubiki); 215: "Fight or Flight" (やるか逃げるか, Yaru ka nigeru ka); 216: "No Control"; 217: "Internal Matters" (内なる・・・・, Uchinaru); 218: "The Next Stage"; 219: "Road to・・・・"
| 26 | 17 May 2011 | 978-4-06-384488-7 | 12 May 2020 | 978-1-64-659358-3 |
220: "Beneath the September Sky" (9月の空の下); 221: "Progress"; 222: "Gravity" (引力, Inryoku); 223: "Thrown Away" (すてごま, Sutegoma); 224: "The Final Lesson" (最後の教え, Saigo no oshie); 225: "Pitfall" (落とし穴, Otoshiana); 226: "Lightning" (カミナリ, Kaminari); 227: "Comeback" (カムバック, Kamubakku); 228: "The Upperclassmen" (先輩達, Senpai-tachi)
| 27 | 17 August 2011 | 978-4-06-384534-1 | 14 July 2020 | 978-1-64-659615-7 |
229: "Visualization" (イメージ, Imēji); 230: "Inheritance" (継承, Keishō); 231: "Guideposts" (道しるべ, Michishirube); 232: "SHINE ON"; 233: "Just do it"; 234: "Not Useless" (何もできないワケじゃない, Nanni mo dekinai wake janai); 235: "Into my Fingertips" (指先から・・・・, Yubisaki kara); 236: "Bonds" (絆, Kizuna); 237: "The Tournament" (トーナメント, Tōnamento)
| 28 | 17 October 2011 | 978-4-06-384564-8 | 8 September 2020 | 978-1-64-659692-8 |
238: "My Generation" (この世代, Kono sedai); 239: "Stumbling Blindly" (躓きながら, Tsumazukinagara); 240: "Another Dimension" (別次元, Betsujigen); 241: "Almost as If" (それはまるで・・, Sore wa marude); 242: "The Results of Summer" (夏を経て, Natsu o hete); 243: "The Key Person" (キーマン, Kīman); 244: "A New Enemy" (新たな敵, Arata na teki); 245: "The Cold Rain" (冷たい雨, Tsumetai ame); 246: "After Resuming Play" (再開後, Saikai-go)
| 29 | 16 December 2011 | 978-4-06-384598-3 | 10 November 2020 | 978-1-64-659798-7 |
247: "On and Off" (ONとOFF, ON to OFF); 248: "OUT OF ORDER"; 249: "Proof" (証明, Shōmei); 250: "Fangs" (牙, Kiba); 251: "The Sound of Rain" (雨が鳴る, Ame ga naru); 252: "Where We Are" (現在地, Genzaichi); 253: "Don't Give Up Yet" (諦めてねぇよ, Akirametenee yo); 254: "Game Theory" (勝負論, Shōbu-ron); 255: "The Script" (筋書き, Sujigaki); 256: "A Sight for Sore Eyes" (景色, Keshiki)
| 30 | 16 March 2012 | 978-4-06-384643-0 | 12 January 2021 | 978-1-64-659907-3 |
257: "One Way to Win" (一つの勝因, Hitotsu no shōin); 258: "Monolith" (一枚岩, Ichimaiiwa); 259: "Our Path" (我が道, Wa ga michi); 260: "Forwards or Backwards" (前進か後退か, Zenshin ka kōtai ka); 261: "You Really Threw It!" (投げたよな, Nageta yo na); 262: "The Big Inning" (ビッグイニング, Bigguiningu); 263: "From the Gut" (腹の底から, Hara no soko kara); 264: "Blossom" (花, Hana); 265: "The Starting Line" (スタートライン, Sutāto rain)
| 31 | 17 May 2012 | 978-4-06-384672-0 | 9 March 2021 | 978-1-64-659998-1 |
266: "A Big Upset" (下剋上, Gekokujō); 267: "Open Your Eyes" (目を醒ませ, Me o samase); 268: "The Ace's Duty" (使命という名の, Shimei to iu na no); 269: "Self-Destruct" (自壊, Jikai); 270: "Unacceptable" (納得いかねえ, Nattoku ikanē); 271: "Underdog" (挑戦者, Charenjā)); 272: "Fissure" (亀裂, Kiretsu); 273: "The Setup" (セットアップ, Settoappu); 274: "A Piercing Glare" (眼光, Gankō)
| 32 | 17 August 2012 | 978-4-06-384704-8 | 11 May 2021 | 978-1-63-699092-7 |
275: "Resonance" (共鳴, Kyōmei); 276: "What We Carry" (背負うモノ, Seou mono); 277: "A Foul Mood" (良くないムード, Yokunai mūdo); 278: "Key Player" (女房役, Nyōbō-yaku); 279: "On the Attack" (アタック, Atakku); 280: "Indifferent" (淡々と, Tantanto); 281: "It's Easy to Give Up" (諦めるのは簡単だ, Akirameru no wa kantanda); 282: "Our Part" (役割, Yakuwari); 283: "Chain Reaction" (連鎖反応, Rensa han'nō)
| 33 | 17 October 2012 | 978-4-06-384748-2 | 13 July 2021 | 978-1-63-699218-1 |
284: "Good Enough for Me" (それだけで十分だ, Sore dakede jūbunda); 285: "Unreasonable" (理屈じゃねぇ, Rikutsu janee); 286: "Tightly-Held Pride" (守り抜いた誇り, Mamorinuita puraido); 287: "Heroes and Villains" (悪者は悪者らしく, Warumono wa warumonorashiku); 288: "Confrontation" (対峙, Taiji); 289: "The Enemy Within" (内なる敵 目の前の敵, Uchinaru teki, Me no mae no teki); 290: "All Out" (全力少年, Zenryoku shōnen); 291: "Cutthroat Competition" (妥協なき挑戦, Dakyō naki chōsen); 292: "A Smouldering Flame" (燻（くすぶ）る火種, Kusuburu hidane)
| 34 | 17 December 2012 | 978-4-06-384781-9 | 14 September 2021 | 978-1-63-699353-9 |
293: "Former Path, Future Path" (かつての道 これからの道, Katsute no michi korekara no michi); 294: "Withdrawal" (離脱, Ridatsu); 295: "Is That How You Really Feel?" (本気で言ってるのか？, Honki de itteru no ka?); 296: "I Look Up as I Walk" (上を向いて歩こう, Uewomuitearukō); 297: "Not Enough" (まだ足りねぇ, Mada tarinee); 298: "The Devil's Whispers" (悪魔のささやき？, Akuma no sasayaki?); 299: "A Stopgap Solution" (付け焼き刃, Tsukeyakiba); 300: "An Original Pitch" (オリジナル, Orijinaru); 301: "Sudden Debut" (ぶっつけ本番, Buttsuke honban)
| 35 | 15 March 2013 | 978-4-06-384827-4 | 9 November 2021 | 978-1-63-699459-8 |
302: "Unveiling" (初披露, Hatsu hirō); 303: "Advancement" (歩み, Ayumi); 304: "Percentile" (偏差値, Hensa-chi); 305: "Clues" (糸口, Itoguchi); 306: "The Audience's Understanding" (スタンドの頭脳, Sutando no zunō); 307: "Boss Monster" (ボスゴリ, Bosugori); 308: "Making a Choice"; 309: "A Question of Trust" (頼りになるとな？, Tayorininaru to na?); 310: "Throbbing" (躍動, Yakudō)
| 36 | 17 May 2013 | 978-4-06-384864-9 | 8 March 2022 | 978-1-63-699651-6 |
311: "Synergy" (相乗効果, Sōjō kōka); 312: "Kindness for the Loser" (敗者の弁, Haisha no ben); 313: "Show Some Determination" (意志を示せ, Ishi o shimese); 314: "The Final Four" (四強, Yon kyō); 315: "Upstart Underclassman" (生意気な後輩, Namaikina kōhai); 316: "A Common Goal" (同じ目的・・・・, Onaji mokuteki); 317: "An Innocent Proposition" (進言, Shingen); 318: "King of the Bullpen" (ブルペンの主, Burupen no nushi); 319: "A Formidable Opponent" (手強い相手, Tegowai aite)
| 37 | 16 August 2013 | 978-4-06-394910-0 | 10 May 2022 | 978-1-68-491166-0 |
320: "Pride of the Reserves" (控えの意地, Hikae no iji); 321: "Probing" (探り合い, Saguri ai); 322: "Pupil" (教え子, Oshiego); 323: "Brand-new Style" (新しいスタイル, Atarashī sutairu); 324: "Remember"; 325: "A Message" (メッセージ, Messēji); 326: "A Debt to Settle" (清算, Seisan); 327: "The Team's Condition" (チームの事情, Chīmu no jijō); 328: "The Champion's Cry" (王者の掛け声, Ōja no kakegoe)
| 38 | 17 October 2013 | 978-4-06-394943-8 | 12 July 2022 | 978-1-68-491344-2 |
329: "Down Deep" (腹の底, Hara no soko); 330: "Shaping Up" (いい形, Ī katachi); 331: "A Mature Admission" (大人の, Otona no); 332: "Him" (彼, Kare); 333: "Intimidation" (威圧, Iatsu); 334: "Covering" (カバーリング, Kabāringu); 335: "Encounter" (出会い頭, Deaigashira); 336: "Title" (称号, Shōgō); 337: "Bud" (芽生え, Mebae); 338: "Those Who Overcome" (突破者, Toppa mono)
| 39 | 17 December 2013 | 978-4-06-394984-1 | 13 September 2022 | 978-1-68-491431-9 |
339: "Instinct" (本能, Honnō); 340: "I Can't Lose" (負けられねぇんだよ, Make rarenē nda yo); 341: "Batter's Delight" (打者の華, Dasha no hana); 342: "Determination" (不退転, Futaiten); 343: "Field of View" (視界, Shikai); 344: "New Ground" (新境地, Shin kyōchi); 345: "Test of Endurance" (根くらべ, Ne kurabe); 346: "Guardian Deity" (守護神, Shugojin); 347: "The Flipside of Stupidity" (バカの向こう側, Baka no mukō-gawa)
| 40 | 17 March 2014 | 978-4-06-395025-0 | 8 November 2022 | 978-1-68-491534-7 |
348: "The Tenth Man" (10番目の男, Ju-banme no otoko); 349: "Longing" (渇望, Katsubō); 350: "The World Ahead" (その先の世界, Sono saki no sekai); 351: "What Began in Summer" (夏の続き, Natsu no tsudzuki); 352: "Strength's Proof" (強さの証明, Tsuyosa no shōmei); 353: "Fierce Pride" (激しく昂ぶる, Hageshiku takaburu); 354: "The Unbelievable" (マジな奴, Majina yatsu); 355: "Burning Hot" (ヒリヒリ, Hirihiri); 356: "The Pride of the Ace" (エースの矜持, Eisu no kyōji)
| 41 | 16 May 2014 | 978-4-06-395079-3 | 10 January 2023 | 978-1-68-491634-4 |
357: "Who you Callin'"Appetizer"?" (誰が前座だ！, Dare ga zenza da!); 358: "Alternatives" (選択肢, Sentakushi); 359: "Relying on Instinct" (本能のままに, Honnō no mama ni); 360: "Equally Hungry" (強欲の類い, Gōyoku no tagui); 361: "The Miracle Pitch" (魔の一球, Ma no ichikyū); 362: "Someone's Influence" (誰かの影響で, Dareka no eikyō); 363: "My Own Two Feet" (この足で, Kono ashi de); 364: "To Cheer you on" (エールに決まってんだろ, Ēru ni kimatte ndaro); 365: "Burdened with Hopes" (期待を背負って, Kitai o seotte)
| 42 | 17 July 2014 | 978-4-06-395125-7 | 14 March 2023 | 978-1-68-491845-4 |
366: "Just Like Old Times" (あの頃のように, Anogoro no yō ni); 367: "Starting Over" (原点回帰, Genten kaiki); 368: "Sunny and 60º" (気温15°C、快晴, Kion 15°C, kaisei); 369: "THE SHOW MUST GO ON"; 370: "Opening" (突破口, Toppakō); 371: "Staying Positive" (ポジティブマインド, Pojitibum aindo); 372: "Be Bold" (大胆にいこう, Daitan ni ikou); 373: "Like A Different Person" (まるで別人, Marude betsujin); 374: "Free Gift" (プレゼント, Purezento)
| 43 | 17 September 2014 | 978-4-06-395187-5 | 9 May 2023 | 978-1-68-491931-4 |
375: "Base Coach" (コーチャー, Kōchā); 376: "Unique Specimen" (意外な人物, Igaina jinbutsu); 377: "Full Assault" (急襲, Kyūshū); 378: "Amazing People" (すごい奴ら, Sugoi yatsura); 379: "My Side" (こっち側, Kotchi ga wa); 380: "Over and Over" (何度でも何度でも, Nandodemo nandodemo); 381: "Scratch" (爪痕（つめあと）, Tsumeato); 382: "Futile Striving" (悲しき一人相撲・・・・, Kanashiki hitorizu mō); 383: "All My Energy" (込めといた, Kome toita)
| 44 | 17 November 2014 | 978-4-06-395242-1 | 11 July 2023 | 979-8-88-933035-6 |
384: "Your Greatest Ever" (最高のストレート, Saikō no sutorēto); 385: "Not Like Him" (らしくないこと, Rashikunai koto); 386: "How Scary" (怖い場所, Kowai basho); 387: "Focus On the First" (初球集中, Shokyū shūchū); 388: "What Do You Think?" (どうなんだ？, Dōna nda?); 389: "On the Field" (そこに立つ者, Soko ni tatsu mono); 390: "A Proper Greeting" (挨拶がわり, Aisatsu-gawari); 391: "Pep Talk" (マウンド会議, Maundo kaigi); 392: "Jumping the Gun" (フライング, Furaingu)
| 45 | 16 January 2015 | 978-4-06-358728-9 | 12 September 2023 | 979-8-88-933141-4 |
393: "The Mood in the Stadium" (現場の空気, Genba no kūki); 394: "Going the Distance" (夢の距離, Yume no kyori); 395: "Hit List" (倒す男リスト, Taosu otoko risuto); 396: "Partnership" (パートナーシップ, Pātonāshippu); 397: "Telepathy" (以心伝心, Ishindenshin); 398: "Say it Again" (もう1回！, Mō ikkai!); 399: "The Can-Do Men" (お祭り男共, Omatsuri otokodomo); 400: "Fill the Stands" (濃度, Nōdo); 401: "Heart Pounding" (胸がバクバク, Mune ga bakubaku)
| 46 | 17 March 2015 | 978-4-06-358729-6 | 14 November 2023 | 979-8-88-933271-8 |
402: "Desperate Times" (絶体絶命, Zettai zetsumei); 403: "Too Good To Be True" (うまい話, Umai hanashi); 404: "Just Wait" (待ってろ！, Mattero!); 405: "Wasted Effort" (無駄な努力, Mudana doryoku); 406: "Towards the Shortstop" (ショートの頭, Shōto no atama); 407: "Keep Me in Boss!" (続投志願, Zokutō shigan); 408: "Unfit to be Captain" (キャプテン失格, Kyaputen shikkaku); 409: "End of an Area" (幕切れ, Makugire); 410: "The Door" (扉, Tobira); 411: "Seek Diamonds"
| 47 | 17 August 2015 | 978-4-06-395498-2 | 9 January 2024 | 979-8-88-933322-7 |
Extra Story. "The Seido Scrapbook" (青道ダイアリ, Seidō daiari); Epilogue 1. "Comeback" (カムバック, Kamubakku); Extra Story: "Spirits"; Epilogue 2. "Winter Training" (ウインターキャンプ, Uintā kyanpu); Epilogue 3. "New Year's"; 412. "Glory"

=== Act II ===
| No. | Release date | ISBN |
|---|---|---|
| 1 | 17 November 2015 | 978-4-06-395547-7 |
001: "Beyond the Dream" (夢の先, Yume no saki); 002: "Limelight" (脚光, Kyakkō); 003: "Overflow" (溢れ出す, Afure dasu); 004: "I Want to Stand There Now" (早く立ちたい, Hayaku tachitai); 005: "Baseball Godsend" (野球の申し子, Yakyū no mōshigo); 006: "Spring Snow" (春の雪, Haru no yuki); 007: "Concord" (呼応, Kōu); 008: "Bystander" (傍観者, Bōkan-sha); 009: "The Day It All Begins" (はじまりの日, Hajimari no hi)
| 2 | 17 February 2016 | 978-4-06-395598-9 |
010: "Change" (変化, Henka); 011: "Spring's Sun" (春の陽, Haru no hi); 012: "Meeting" (合流, Gōryū); 013: "The Player Worth Seeing" (お目当ての選手, O meate no senshu); 014: "Go Straight"; 015: "Meet the New Faces" (初顔合わせ, Hatsu kaoawase); 016: "KING"; 017: "Sparks" (火花, Hibana); 018: "Little by Little..." (それは徐々に..., Sore wa jojoni...)
| 3 | 17 May 2016 | 978-4-06-395667-2 |
019: "The Place They are Aiming For" (目指すべき場所, Mezasubeki basho); 020: "Amount of Frustration" (悔しさの数, Kuyashisa no kazu); 021: "Open Spots" (空席, Kūseki); 022: "Adrenaline Shot" (カンフル剤, Kanfuru zai); 023: "Development" (転回, Tenkai); 024: "Caution! Do Not Mix!" (まぜるな危険, Mazeru na kiken); 025: "Battle × Battle" (バトル×バトル, Batoru × batoru); 026: "The Me of the Past" (かつての自分, Katsute no jibun); 027: "Maiden Battle" (初陣, Uijin)
| 4 | 17 September 2016 | 978-4-06-395709-9 |
028: "A Sign" (兆し, Kizashi); 029: "Hope or Wish" (期待か希望か, Kitai ka ganbō ka); 030: "Looking Ahead" (視線の先, Shisen no saki); 031: "The Other Places' Aces" (他所のエース, Yoso no ēsu); 032: "Playing Catch" (キャッチボール, Kyatchi bōru); 033: "Selfishness" (ワガママ, Wagamama); 034: "Inside The Heart" (心の中, Kokoro no naka); 035: "Triangle" (トライアングル, Toraianguru); 036: "Numbers" (ナンバーズ, Nanbāzu); 037: "Batting First" (先攻, Senkō)
| 5 | 17 October 2016 | 978-4-06-395782-2 |
038: "Offense and Defense of the First Inning" (初回の攻防, Shokai no kōbō); 039: "A Hint" (気配, Kehai); 040: "Stance" (スタンス, Sutansu); 041: "Those Shouldering the Responsibility" (背負いし者, Seoishi mono); 042: "What Are You Doing" (何やってんだよ, Nani yattenda yo); 043: "Interception" (迎撃, Geigeki); 044: "Energetic Guy on Base" (塁上の元気者, Ruijō no genkimono); 045: "Inevitable" (不可避, Fukahi); 046: "Only Winning" (勝ってこそ, Katte koso)
| 6 | 17 February 2017 | 978-4-06-395822-5 |
047: "Groundless Pride" (根拠のない自信, Konkyo no nai jishin); 048: "Still Immature" (大人げないまま, Otonagenai mama); 049: "3 Months" (3か月, Sankagetsu); 050: "We Can't Lose Now Can We?" (負けられねぇよな, Make rarenē yo na); 051: "I Like That... Look Better" (いい顔になってきた, Ī kao ni natte kita); 052: "I Want to Check It for Myself" (確かめたいもの, Tashikametai mono); 053: "Rite of Passage" (通過儀礼, Tsūka girei); 054: "It Will Work" (通用するよ, Tsūyō suru yo); 055: "Aggressive Stand" (戦う姿勢, Tatakau shisei)
| 7 | 17 April 2017 | 978-4-06-395915-4 |
056: "Assertiveness" (自己主張, Jiko shuchō); 057: "Teachings" (教え, Oshie); 058: "Swing" (スイング, Suingu); 059: "There's No Time" (時間がない, Jikan ga nai); 060: "For Whom" (誰がために, Da ga tameni); 061: "Shuffle" (シャッフル, Shaffuru); 062: "Real Practice" (練習の本番, Renshū no honban); 063: "Designated" (指名, Shimei); 064: "Rivals" (ライバル達, Raibarutachi)
| 8 | 14 July 2017 | 978-4-06-510036-3 |
065: "Idling" (アイドリング, Aidoringu); 066: "One Pitch, One Second" (一球一秒, Ikkyū ichibyō); 067: "The Time" (タイム, Taimu); 068: "Who?" (何者, Nanimono); 069: "Favorable" (好転, Kōten); 070: "Incomplete" (未完成, Mikansei); 071: "Fruitlessly" (空回り, Karamawari); 072: "Ban Lifted" (解禁, Kaikin); 073: "Individual Strength and the Shape of the Team" (個の力 チームの形, Kono chikara chīmu no katachi); 074: "Sprout" (萌芽, Hōga)
| 9 | 15 September 2017 | 978-4-06-510192-6 |
075: "Under the Same Flag" (同じ旗の下, Onaji hata no moto); 076: "The Way Home" (帰路, Kiro); 077: "The Golden Age" (黄金時代, Ogon jidai); 078: "The Note"; 079: "Sights on Major League" (メジャー志向, Mejā shikō); 080: "Morning Activities" (朝活, Asa katsu); 081: "Resolute" (確固, Kakko); 082: "I'm Not Stopping" (止まんねぇからな, Tomannē kara na); 083: "BLOOM OF YOUTH"
| 10 | 15 December 2017 | 978-4-06-510389-0 |
084: "You Have Me" (俺がいる, Ore ga iru); 085: "Salute" (祝砲, Shukuhō); 086: "Salute 2" (祝砲2, Shukuhō 2); 087: "Something Of An Oath" (誓いのようなもの, Chikai no yōna mono); 088: "Seventeens" (セブンティーンズ, Sebuntīnzu); 089: "Navigator" (ナビゲーター, Nabigētā); 090: "At the Foot of Mt. Fuji" (富士の麓, Fuji no fumoto); 091: "Imminent Comeback" (復帰間近, Fukki madjika); 092: "Thirst" (渇望, Katsubō); 093: "To Each Their Own" (それぞれの, Sorezore no)
| 11 | 16 March 2018 | 978-4-06-510971-7 |
094: "Comeback" (帰還, Kikan); 095: "Express It" (表現せよ, Hyōgen seyo); 096: "Heat Transfer" (伝熱, Den'netsu); 097: "Tall Wall" (高い壁, Takai kabe); 098: "Team Assembled" (集結, Shūketsu); 099: "Contest" (競演, Kyōen); 100: "Light the Fire" (火をつけろ, Hi o tsukero); 101: "A Little Longer" (一日の長, Ichijitsu no chō); 102: "Japanese Style" (ジャパニーズ, Japanīzu sutairu)
| 12 | 15 June 2018 | 978-4-06-511668-5 |
103: "Bad Man" (悪い男, Warui otoko); 104: "Japanese Samurai" (日本のサムライ, Japan no samurai); 105: "Because He's Awesome" (スゲー奴だから, Sugē yatsu dakara); 106: "Narumiya Mei" (メイ ナルミヤ, Mei Narumiya); 107: "The Tyrant of the Mound" (マウンドの暴君, Maundo no bōkun); 108: "Take It Back" (取り戻せ, Torimodose); 109: "Readiness to Support" (バックアップ態勢, Bakkuappu taisei); 110: "As A Catcher" (捕手として, Hoshu to shite); 111: "Unexpected Future" (予期せぬ未来, Yoki senu mirai)
| 13 | 17 August 2018 | 978-4-06-511987-7 |
112: "Being Yourself" (2人の特性, Futari no rashiki); 113: "How the Invincible Think" (常勝思考, Jōshō shikō); 114: "Baseball Kids" (ベースボールキッズ, Bēsubōru kizzu); 115: "Gotta Win" (勝たないかん, Katanai kan); 116: "This is Not the Real Power Yet" (こんなもんじゃねぇ, Kon'na mon ja nē); 117: "Fragile" (フラジャイル, Furajairu); 118: "Seesaw Game" (五分五分, Gobugobu); 119: "Pillar of Support" (支柱, Shichū); 120: "Counting On You" (頼んだぞ, Tanonda zo)
| 14 | 16 November 2018 | 978-4-06-512996-8 |
121: "The Southpaw With Moving Pitches" (クセ球のサウスポー, Kusedama no sausupō); 122: "Super First Year" (超1年生, Sūpā ichinen sei); 123: "Sign Exchange" (サイン交換, Sain kōkan); 124: "Face" (面構え, Tsuragamae); 125: "Blind Turd of A Base Coach" (ふし穴クソコーチャー, Fushi ana kusokōchā); 126: "A Gaping Hole" (風穴, Kazaana); 127: "In the Same Boat" (運命共同体, Unmei kyōdōtai); 128: "Strike back"; 129: "Last Summer" (最後の夏, Saigo no natsu)
| 15 | 17 January 2019 | 978-4-06-513489-4 |
130: "Trap" (罠, Wana); 131: "Reload" (リロード, Rirōdo); 132: "Borderline" (ボーダーライン, Bōdārain); 133: "The Twenty" (20人, Nijūnin); 134: "Summer Training Camp" (夏合宿, Natsu gasshuku); 135: "Rabbit or Turtle" (ウサギかカメか, Usagi ka Kame ka); 136: "Social Gathering" (交流会, Kōryū kai); 137: "Path" (通い路, Kayoi-ji); 138: "Set Sail" (航進, Kōshin)
| 16 | 17 April 2019 | 978-4-06-515298-0 |
139: "Pyramid" (ピラミッド, Piramiddo); 140: "Answer" (アンサー, Ansā); 141: "The Number One Guy" (ナンバーワン野郎, Nanbāwan yarō); 142: "No pain No gain"; 143: "Greetings" (ご挨拶, Goaisatsu); 144: "Supersonic Jet Boy" (スーパーソニックジェットボーイ, Sūpā sonikku jetto bōi); 145: "Pep Talk" (激励, Gekirei); 146: "On A Sleepless Night" (眠れない夜に, Nemurenaiyoru ni); 147: "Passionately" (無我夢中, Muga muchū)
| 17 | 17 June 2019 | 978-4-06-515140-2 |
148: "The Foothold" (足元, Ashimoto); 149: "Get back"; 150: "The Nabe Check" (ナベチェック, Nabe chekku); 151: "The Same Pitch" (同じ球, Onaji tama); 152: "Unawares" (知らず知らず, Shirazushirazu); 153: "Precautions" (伏線, Fukusen); 154: "Charged" (込めたもの, Kometamano); 155: "The All-Out Seidou" (本気の青道, Honki no Seidō); 156: "Probing" (探り合い, Saguriai)
| 18 | 16 August 2019 | 978-4-06-516665-9 |
157: "The End" (終止符, Shūshifu); 158: "Thank You" (ありがとう, Arigatō); 159: "So Long as the Team Keeps Winning" (勝ち続ければ, Kachi tsudzukereba); 160: "FIRE AGE"; 161: "Quiet" (静かなる, Shizukanaru); 162: "The Super Combo" (スーパーコンボ, Sūpā konbo); 163: "Footloose" (フットルース, Futtorūsu); 164: "Shine the Light" (光射す, Hikari sasu); 165: "That's More Like It" (それでこそ, Sorede koso)
| 19 | 17 October 2019 | 978-4-06-517165-3 |
166: "Summer Angels" (サマーエンジェルズ, Samā enjeruzu); 167: "The Me Now" (今の俺, Ima no Ore); 168: "Last-Ditch Effort" (死力, Shiryoku); 169: "The Focus of the Gaze" (見据える先, Misueru saki); 170: "Over and Over" (幾度となく, Ikudotonaku); 171: "The Third Time" (3度目の・・, Sandome no); 172: "The Batting Monkey and the Genius Boy" (バット猿とジーニアスボーイ, Batto saru to jīniasu bōi); 173: "This is What You're Waiting For, Right?" (待ってんだろ？, Mattendaro?); 174: "Yakushi's Weakness" (薬師の弱点, Yakushi no jakuten)
| 20 | 17 January 2020 | 978-4-06-517550-7 |
175: "Ichidai's Pressure" (市大の圧, Ichidai no atsu); 176: "Round 2" (第2ラウンド, Dai ni raundo); 177: "The Pride of 2 Fingers" (指2本分のプライド, Yubi ni honbun no puraido); 178: "Thermography" (サーモグラフィー, Sāmogurafī); 179: "Light and Dark" (明と暗, Mei to an); 180: "For the Team" (チームのために, Chīmu no tame ni); 181: "The Us of Last Year" (去年の自分, Kyonen no jibun); 182: "Breath" (息吹, Ibuki); 183: "The Fourth Batter" (4番の男, Yoban no Otoko)
| 21 | 17 April 2020 | 978-4-06-518557-5 |
184: "Within" (己の中, Onore no Naka); 185: "Rivalry" (張り合い, Hariai); 186: "It's Only Starting for Us" (まだこれから・・・, Mada kore kara...); 187: "The Path of the Winner" (勝者の道, Shōsha no michi); 188: "The Embodiment of Hopes" (期待の表れ, Kitai no araware); 189: "Place Like That" (みたいな場所, Mitai na basho); 190: "The Same Amount" (同じ分量, Onaji bunryō); 191: "Ends and Means" (目的と手段, Mokuteki to shudan); 192: "Amount of Experiences" (経験値, Keikenchi)
| 22 | 17 July 2020 | 978-4-06-519179-8 |
193: "Today's Numbers" (本日のナンバーズ, Honjitsu no nanbāzu); 194: "Not Yet!" (まだまだ！！, Mada mada!!); 195: "That's the Pitcher's" (それが投手の, Sore ga Tōshu no); 196: "Alive and Well" (健在, Kenzai); 197: "Beyond" (その先へ, Sono saki e); 198: "The Next Opponents" (次の相手, Tsugi no aite); 199: "Our Tomorrow" (俺たちの明日, Oretachi no Ashita); 200: "That Back" (その背中, Sono Senaka); 201: "Strong Style" (ストロングスタイル, Sutorongu Sutairu)
| 23 | 17 September 2020 | 978-4-06-520601-0 |
202: "Food for Growth" (成長の糧, Seichō no Kate); 203: "Mentor Chris" (師 クリス, Shi Kurisu); 204: "Of Awakening" (お目覚めの, O Mezame no); 205: "The Reflection of the Dugout" (ベンチの鏡, Benchi no Kagami); 206: "Something Awesome" (何か凄いこと, Nanika Sugoi Koto); 207: "Bang" (豪音, Gōon); 208: "I Want to Shut Them All Up" (黙らせたい, Damarasetai); 209: "Scream" (叫び, Sakebi); 210: "No Different" (同じだよ, Onajidayo)
| 24 | 17 November 2020 | 978-4-06-521255-4 |
211: "Circumstances" (常態, Jōtai); 212: "Preparations to Win" (勝つ準備, Katsu Junbi); 213: "Vision" (ヴィジョン, Vijon); 214: "Initiative" (集大成の, Shūtaisei no); 215: "Reserve" (リザーブ, Rizābu); 216: "Guardian Spirit" (守護神, Shugoshin); 217: "Gift" (ギフト, Gifuto); 218: "Reading the Room" (空気を読むな, Kūki o Yomu na); 219: "Repertoire" (持ち球, Mochidama)
| 25 | 17 February 2021 | 978-4-06-521685-9 |
220: "Presentation" (プレゼンテーション, Purezentēshon); 221: "Discomfort" (違和感, Iwakan); 222: "Appeal" (嘆願, Tangan); 223: "The Choice of the Team" (チームの選択, Chīmu no Sentaku); 224: "Unveiling" (お披露目, Ohirome); 225: "Unknown" (未知, Michi); 226: "Insta-kill" (瞬殺, Shunsatsu); 227: "This is Sankou" (これが三高, Kore ga Sankō); 228: "Building Up" (積み上げてきたもの, Tsumiagete Kita Mono)
| 26 | 16 April 2021 | 978-4-06-522517-2 |
229: "Last Boss" (親玉, Oyadama); 230: "Record"; 231: "My Role" (俺の役目, Ore no Yakume); 232: "His Form" (自分の形, Jibun no Katachi); 233: "Good Gameflow" (いい流れ, Ī Nagare); 234: "The Ideal Ace" (エースの理念, Ēsu no Rinen); 235: "Step On"; 236: "Move"; 237: "Member of the Team" (チームの一員, Chīmu no Ichiin)
| 27 | 16 July 2021 | 978-4-06-523587-4 |
238: "Beyond the Limit"; 239: "High Voltage"; 240: "The Source" (源流, Genryū); 241: "Seidō's Pressure" (青道の圧, Seidō no Atsu); 242: "My Battle" (俺の戦い, Ore no Tatakai); 243: "Of Help to Someone" (誰かの力, Dareka no Chikara); 244: "The Representative" (代表者, Daihyōsha); 245: "Connect!!" (繋げ！！, Tsunage!!); 246: "The Mightiest 1- & 2-Holes" (最強の1、2番, Saikyō no 1, 2-ban)
| 28 | 17 August 2021 | 978-4-06-524482-1 |
247: "The Senpais" (先輩たち, Senpai-tachi); 248: "It's Not Over" (終われないよな, Owarenai yona); 249: "Are You Watching?" (見えてんのか？, Mieten no ka?); 250: "Kept You Waiting" (待またせたな, Mata seta na); 251: "Not a Dream" (夢ゆめじゃない, Yume ja nai); 252: "The Door to Memories" (記き憶おく, の扉とびら, Kioku no tobira); 253: "Into that Mitt" (あのミットへ, Ano mitto e); 254: "The Next Stage" (次つぎのステージ, Tsugi no sutēji); 255: "The Gossiped Truths" (噂うわさの真しん相そう, Uwasa no shinsō)
| 29 | 17 December 2021 | 978-4-06-526003-6 |
256: "Endless Road" (道果てしなく, Michi hateshi naku); 257: "Brace Yourself" (覚悟しとけよ, Kakugo shitoke yo); 258: "Can't Wait" (待ちきれねえよ, Machikirenei yo); 259: "Things Not to Be Compromised On" (譲れないこと, Yuzurenai koto); 260: "That Day" (あの日, Ano hi); 261: "2 Years and 4 Months" (2年と4か月, 2-Nen to 4-kagetsu); 262: "The Eve of the Decisive Battle" (決戦前夜, Kessen zen'ya); 263: "The Duty of Captain" (主将の役割, Shushō no yakuwari); 264: "Simulations" (シミュレーション, Shimyurēshon)
| 30 | 17 March 2022 | 978-4-06-526896-4 |
265: "Calculations" (思惑, Omowaku); 266: "Full Throttle" (フルスロットル, Furusurottoru); 267: "The Two Pitchers' Start" (両投手の立ち上がり, Ryō tōshu no tachiagari); 268: "The Avatar of Loneliness" (孤独の化身, Kodoku no Keshin); 269: "Trailblazer" (先人, Senjin); 270: "Transmission" (伝播, Denpa); 271: "Sharpshooting" (狙い撃て, Nerai ute); 272: "The Memory" (記憶, Kioku); 273: "The Way of Being" (在り方, Arikata); 274: "Tingling with Excitement" (血湧き肉躍れ, Chi waki niku odore)
| 31 | 17 June 2022 | 978-4-06-527917-5 |
275: "Soul Power"; 276: "Taste of Victory" (勝利の味, Shōri no aji); 277: "Feel" (感触, Kanshoku); 278: "Holding Out For a Hero" (英雄にあこがれて, Eiyū ni akogarete); 279: "Be Here Now"; 280: "Sore Loser Contest" (負けん気合戦, Makenki gassen); 281: "Like the Time When We First Met" (出会った頃のように, Deatta koro no yō ni); 282: "Limit" (夢幻, Mugen); 283: "Dream Team" (憧れのチーム, Akogareno chīmu)
| 32 | 16 December 2022 | 978-4-06-527917-5 |
284: "Amazing People" (凄い人達, Sugoi hitotachi); 285: "It is Here" (ここにある, Koko ni aru); 286: "Baton" (バトン, Baton); 287: "Ace Appears" (エース登場, Ēsu tōjō); 288: "Breath of the Mound" (マウンドの呼吸, Maundo no kokyū); 289: "Face of the Year" (今年の顔, Kotoshi no kao); 290: "Not Bad" (悪くねえな, Warukunē na); 291: "Mutual Offset" (相思相殺, Sōshi Sōsai); 292: "Shape of Combi" (コンビの形, Konbi no katachi)
| 33 | 17 February 2023 | 978-4-06-530351-1 |
293: "A Group of Strong Men" (強者（つわもの）たちの群れ, Tsuwamono (tsu wa mono)-tachi no mure); 294: "SPIRIT OF COMBAT"; 295: "Swing!!"; 296: "Ace Vessel" (エースの器, Ēsu no utsuwa); 297: "For This Day" (この日のため, Kono Ni~Tsu no tame); 298: "Wildcard" (ワイルドカード, Wairudokādo); 299: "Deepening" (深化, Shinka); 300: "Southpaw" (サウスポー, Sausupō); 301: "Power of Love" (愛の力, Ai no chikara)
| 34 | 17 May 2023 | 978-4-06-531287-2 |
302: "Monster" (魔物, Mamono); 303: "Scout Group" (スカウト組, Sukauto-gumi); 304: "Motherfucker World" (くそったれの世界, Kuso ttare no sekai); 305: "Gold Medal" (黄金メダル, Ki kinmedaru); 306: "Your Song to Fight" (戦う君の歌, Tatakau kimi no uta); 307: "See you at Koshien" (甲子園で会いましょう, Kōshien de aimashō); 308: "Ace of Diamond" (ダイヤのA（エース）, Daiya no A (ēsu))

=== Act II Side Story: Teito vs Ugumori ===
| No. | Release date | ISBN |
|---|---|---|
| 1 | 16 May 2025 | 978-4-06-539656-8 |
1: "Summer Contenders" (真夏の挑戦者, Manatsu no chōsen sha); 2: "Lightning and Pompadour" (カミナリとリーゼント); 3: "A Message" (メッセージ); 4: "The Spotlight" (スポットライト); 5: "Walk on the Wild Side" (ワイルドサイドを歩け); 6: "Teito, the Best There Is" (帝東最強); 7: "With a Smile" (笑えれば); 8: "The Pinstripes" (縦縞のユニホーム); 9: "The Final Pitch" (最後の一球); 10: "A Ball to Remember" (白球の記憶)

=== Omnibus edition ===
| No. | Release date | ISBN | Collects |
|---|---|---|---|
| 1 | March 23, 2027 | 978-1-54-583840-2 | Act I Volumes 1–3 |
