= Duncan J. Watts =

American sociologist (born 1971)

Duncan Watts
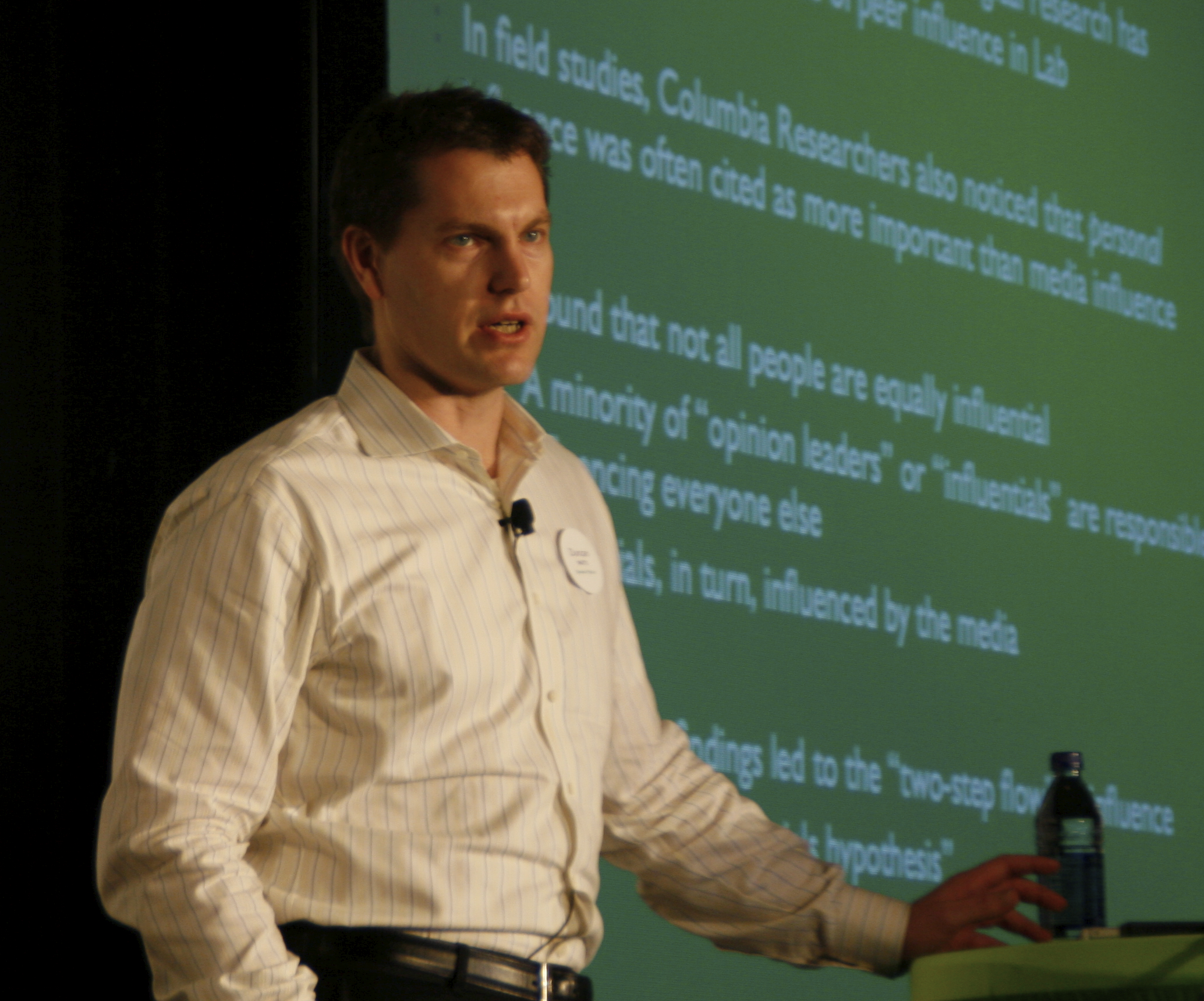
- Watts presenting at iCitizen 2008
- Born: February 20, 1971 (age 55); Guelph, Ontario
- Education: University of New South Wales; Cornell University (PhD)
- Known for: Watts and Strogatz model
- Notable work: Six Degrees: The Science of a Connected Age
- Awards: Elected member, National Academy of Sciences, 2023 Elected member, American Academy of Arts and Sciences, 2026 Fellow, American Association for the Advancement of Science, 2021 Andrew Carnegie Fellow, 2020 Fellow of the Network Science Society (NetSci), 2018. Everett M. Rogers Award, 2014 Lagrange–CRT Foundation Prize for Complexity Science, 2013 German Physical Society Young Scientist Award for Socio- and Econophysics, 2009
- Scientific career
- Fields: Sociology, network science
- Workplaces: Columbia University; Microsoft Research; Santa Fe Institute; Yahoo! Research; Nuffield College, Oxford; University of Pennsylvania
- Thesis: The structure and dynamics of small-world systems (1997)
- Doctoral advisor: Steven Strogatz
- Website: www.asc.upenn.edu/people/faculty/duncan-j-watts-phd

Duncan James Watts (born February 20, 1971) is a computational social scientist who is the Stevens University Professor and 23rd Penn Integrates Knowledge University Professor at the University of Pennsylvania. He holds primary faculty appointments in the Annenberg School for Communication, the Department of Computer and Information Science, and the Wharton School's Department of Operations, Information and Decisions, where he is the inaugural Rowan Fellow, and a secondary appointment in the Department of Sociology. He was formerly a principal researcher at Microsoft Research in New York City, where he was one of the lab's founding members and is known for his work on small-world networks and for helping to establish the fields of network science and computational social science.

== Education ==
Watts received a Bachelor of Science degree in physics from the University of New South Wales and a PhD in Theoretical and Applied Mechanics from Cornell University, where his advisor was Steven Strogatz. Before his academic career, Watts served in the Royal Australian Navy from 1988 to 1993, first as a midshipman, while completing his undergraduate degree through the Australian Defence Force Academy, and subsequently as a sub-lieutenant.

== Career ==
After completing his doctorate, Watts held postdoctoral fellowships at Columbia University (1997–1998), the Santa Fe Institute (1998–1999), and the MIT Sloan School of Management (1999–2000). He joined the Department of Sociology at Columbia University as an assistant professor in 2000, rising to full professor by 2006. During this time, he founded and directed the Collective Dynamics Group, in which Peter Dodds and Matt Salganik were members. From 2007 to 2012 he was a principal research scientist at Yahoo! Research, where he led the Human Social Dynamics group, and from 2012 to 2019 he was a principal researcher and partner at Microsoft, where he was a founding member of the Microsoft Research–New York City lab. He also served as an A.D. White Professor-at-Large at Cornell University from 2013 to 2018. In 2019 he moved to the University of Pennsylvania as a Penn Integrates Knowledge University Professor. He has served on advisory committees of the National Science Foundation and on the board of the Pew Research Center.

Since joining Penn, he founded and now directs the Computational Social Science Lab, which is co-constituted across the school of Engineering, Annenberg, and Wharton . He is also the co-director of Penn MEDIATED, the Penn Center for Media, Technology, and Democracy, which spans the same three schools in addition to the Penn Carey Law School, the School of Arts and Sciences, and the Social Policy and Practice School. He also serves as the founding president of the International Society for Computational Social Science.

He is also the author of three books. His first, Small Worlds: The Dynamics of Networks between Order and Randomness (1999), grew out of his doctoral research on the small-world phenomenon, which also formed the basis of his 1998 paper with Steven Strogatz, in which the two presented a mathematical theory of the small world phenomenon. His second, Six Degrees: The Science of a Connected Age translated his small-worlds research His third book, Everything is Obvious *Once You Know the Answer: How Common Sense Fails Us, explains common errors people make when making decisions especially for groups or organizations, and suggests alternative methods using research and data. He also presents some of his research from Yahoo and Microsoft, and comments on the work of some popular nonfiction writers like Canadian Malcolm Gladwell.

Until April 2012, he was a principal research scientist at Yahoo! Research, where he directed the Human Social Dynamics group. Watts joined Microsoft Research in New York City by its opening on May 3, 2012.

Watts describes his research as exploring the "role that network structure plays in determining or constraining system behavior, focusing on a few broad problem areas in social science such as information contagion, financial risk management, and organizational design." More recently he has attracted attention for his modern-day replication of Stanley Milgram's small world experiment using email messages and for his studies of popularity and fads in on-line and other communities.

In Watts's early career, from 2002 to 2007, he was a frequent collaborator of Peter Sheridan Dodds, now at the University of Vermont's Vermont Complex Systems Center.

== Honors and awards ==
Watts was elected to the National Academy of Sciences in 2023 and to the American Academy of Arts and Sciences in 2026. He was elected a Fellow of the American Association for the Advancement of Science in 2021 and was named an Andrew Carnegie Fellow in 2020. In 2018 he was named an inaugural Fellow of the Network Science Society. Earlier honors include the Everett M. Rogers Award (2014), the Lagrange–CRT Foundation Prize for Complexity Science (2013), and the German Physical Society's Young Scientist Award for Socio- and Econophysics (2009).

Watts’ 2001 paper with Mark Newman and Steve Strogatz, "Random graphs with arbitrary degree distributions and their applications," (cite) was named a ''Physical Review'' "milestone paper" (2015) and listed among 50 significant papers in the 125-year history of ''Physical Review'' (2018). In 2021, his 2011 paper, “Everyone’s an influencer: Quantifying Influence on Twitter,” with Eytan Bakshy, Jake Hofman, and Winter Mason (cite), won WSDM “Test of time” award.
