= Mixing patterns =

Systematic tendency of one type of node in a network to connect to another

Mixing patterns refer to systematic tendencies of one type of nodes in a network to connect to another type. For instance, nodes might tend to link to others that are very similar or very different. This feature is common in many social networks, although it also appears sometimes in non-social networks. Mixing patterns are closely related to assortativity; however, for the purposes of this article, the term is used to refer to assortative or disassortative mixing based on real-world factors, either topological or sociological.

== Types of mixing patterns ==
Mixing patterns are a characteristic of an entire network, referring to the extent for nodes to connect to other similar or different nodes. Mixing, therefore, can be classified broadly as assortative or disassortative. Assortative mixing is the tendency for nodes to connect to like nodes, while disassortative mixing captures the opposite case in which very different nodes are connected.

Obviously, the particular node characteristics involved in the process of creating a link between a pair will shape a network's mixing patterns. For instance, in a sexual relationship network, one is likely to find a preponderance of male-female links, while in a friendship network male-male and female-female networks might prevail. Examining different sets of node characteristics thus may reveal interesting communities or other structural properties of the network. In principle there are two kinds of methods used to exploit these properties. One is based on analytical calculations by using generating function techniques. The other is numerical, and is based on Monte Carlo simulations for the graph generation.

In a study on mixing patterns in networks, M.E.J. Newman starts by classifying the node characteristics into two categories. While the number of real-world node characteristics is virtually unlimited, they tend to fall under two headings: discrete and scalar/topological. The following sections define the differences between the categories and provide examples of each. For each category, the models of assortatively mixed networks introduced by Newman are discussed in brief.

== Examples and applications ==
A common application of mixing patterns is the study of disease transmission. For instance, many studies have used mixing to study the spread of HIV/AIDS and other contagious diseases. These articles find a strong connection between Mixing patterns and the rate of disease spread. The findings can also be used to model real-world network growth, as in, or find communities within networks.
