= Park Cheong-ho =

South Korean writer (born 1966)

Park Cheong-ho (Korean: 박청호; born 1966) is a South Korean writer. In 1990, he became known as a "new generation author" and his works received attention for their freedom of form and distinct prose. Though he began his career writing both poetry and prose, he gradually came to focus solely on novels. The unique stylistic aspects of his writing include devices such as the enumeration of imagery, wordplay, and abrupt switches between scenes. In terms of subject matter and themes, he has constructed a literary world imbued with his individuality through the depiction of apathy and disinterest in public order, authority, and traditions, all while in search of a new set of moral and ethical values.

== Life ==
Park Cheong-ho was born in 1966. In college, he studied creative writing with the continuous dream of becoming a writer and displayed an interest in diverse literary genres such as poetry, plays, and novels. Perhaps it is for this reason that his works are characterized by the transgression of conventional literary genres. He made his debut with a poetry collection in 1989 and a play in 1992. With the publication of his novel Geuga nareul salhaehada (그가 나를 살해하다 That Which Kills Me) in 1995, he officially started his career in writing novels as well.

Along with other writers such as Park Seongwon, Baek Minsuk, Song Gyeonga, and Bae Suah, he became part of the so-called "New Generation Authors," known for inaugurating a new sensibility and formation of literature during the 1990s. Their works were characterized by a cheerful and buoyant sensibility, an urbanist imagination, and an ethical numbness regarding sex and sexuality. While Park Cheong-ho's novels also resonate with these characteristics, they differentiated themselves through a sense of identity and self-consciousness. That is, Park's works display a philosophical orientation in which, even as they deal with a chaotic and melancholy reality, possess a kind of self-introspection. Just as the author himself stated that "I will write for the new generation that has suffered in this country," he has maintained the consciousness of a "new generation author" in constructing his literary works.

Moreover, his novels frequently portray the appearance of a father in a decisive moment. This emphasizes the extent to which Park's own father, a Christian pastor, influenced him. He claimed that his father was not the ordinary father of everyday life, but nearly always appeared as a pastor that stood on the border between God and human. Personally unable to accept such a father, Park has stated that it was only after his father died that he became aware of how his father made his own existence possible, and that his father had guided him towards God. In this manner, it is apparent that his father immensely influenced his mentality.

== Writing ==
=== Early works ===
Park Cheong-ho's early novels betray traditional moral values and methods of private ownership, tearing down conventional ways of writing. His first works, such as the 1996 short story collection Dan hanpyeonui yeonaesoseol (단 한편의 연애소설Only One Romance Novel) and the 1995 novel Geuga nareul salhaehada, deal with doubts regarding basic moral order. For instance, he portrays subject matters such as accidental sojourns, apathetic and unmotivated sex and romance, unnecessary murders, adultery, idleness, and psychiatric hospitals and in this manner, the majority of his novels explore the so-called "abnormal" and deviance. On the formal level, his works are written in a very free and experimental style. Through diverse methods such as following a stream of transient emotions as they arise, switching between first and third person to show the intermingling of time, and using devices such as mise-en-abyme in which another story is contained within his own, he materializes a distinct narrative form.

=== Later works ===
Park's works after 2000 extend the tendencies seen in his earlier writings. His 2002 short story collection, Jilbyeonggwa sarang (질병과 사랑 Sickness and Love), portrays a protagonist undergoing the ennui and pain of everyday life in order to render the desire of modern people to escape from everyday life. His experiments in narrative form also continue with devices such as the intermingling of reality and illusion and the exclusion of scenic descriptions. In addition, the short stories "Sangsangdeul" (상상들 Imaginations), "Sageondeul" (사건들 Incidents), and "Haengwideul" (행위들 Actions) included in the 2006 collection Sarangui susahak (사랑의 수사학 The Rhetoric of Love) can each be considered as independent and stand-alone novels in their own right, but nevertheless take the form of an omnibus in which each short story is somehow linked.

== Works ==
=== Poetry collections ===
《치명적인 것들》, 문학과지성사, 1995 / Chimyeongjeogin geotdeul (Lethal Things), Moonji, 1995.

=== Short story collections ===
《단 한편의 연애소설》, 문학과지성사, 1996 / Dan hanpyeonui yeonaesoseol (Only One Romance Novel), Moonji, 1996.

《소년 소녀를 만나다》, 해냄, 1998 / Sonyeon sonyeoreul mannada (Boy Meets Girl), Hainaim, 1998.

《라푼젤의 두번째 물고기》(공편), 봄, 2002 / Rapunjerui dubeonjjae mulgogi (Rapunzel's Second Fish)(co-editor), Bom, 2002.

《질병과 사랑》, 문학과지성사, 2002 / Jilbyeonggwa sarang (Sickness and Love), Moonji, 2002.

《벚꽃 뜰》, 생각의나무, 2005 / Beotkkot tteul (Cherry Blossom Garden), Saenggaguinamu, 2005.

《사랑의 수사학》, 작가정신, 2006. / Sarangui susahak (The Rhetoric of Love), Jakkajungsin, 2006.

《코코스》, 현대문학, 2007 / Kokoseu (Coco's), Hyundae Munhak, 2007.

=== Novels ===
《그가 나를 살해하다》, 세종출판공사, 1995 / Geuga nareul salhaehada (That Which Kills Me), Sejongchulpangongsa, 1995.

《갱스터스 파라다이스》, 문학과지성사, 2000 / Gaengseuteoseu paradaiseu (Gangster's Paradise), Moonji, 2000.

《사흘동안》, 이룸, 2003 / Saheuldongan (For Three Days), Irum, 2003.

=== Children's books ===
《초콜릿 나무》, 푸른마을, 1994 / Chokollit namu (Chocolate Tree), Pureunmaeul, 1994.

《돌아온 어린왕자》, 파랑새, 1997 / Doraon eorinwangja (The Return of the Little Prince), Parangsae, 1997.

《소금 장수와 기름 장수》, 한국헤밍웨이, 2007 / Sogeum jangsuwa gireum jangsu (The Salt Merchant and the Oil Merchant), Korea Hemingway, 2007.

《할머니 어릴적》, 훈민출판사, 2012 / Halmeoni eoriljeok (When Grandma Was Young), Hunmin, 2012.

=== Anthologies ===
《꽃들은 모두 어디로 갔나》, 르네상스, 1997 / Kkotdeureun modu eodiro ganna (Where Have All the Flowers Gone), Reunesangseu, 1997.

《이상한 가역 반응 : 문학과지성사가 주목하는 젊은 작가들》, 문학과지성사, 2000 / Isanghan gayeok baneung : munhakgwajiseongsaga jumokaneun jeolmeun jakgadeul (Strange Reversible Reaction: Notable New Authors from Moonji), Moonji, 2000.

《그대에게 꽃을》, 시공사, 2003 / Geudaeege kkocheul (Flowers For You), Sigongsa, 2003.

《(2004)이효석문학상 수상작품집》, 해토, 2004 / 2004 Lee Hyo-seok munhaksang susangjakpumjip (The Complete Anthology of 2004 Lee Hyo-seok Literary Award Winners), Haeto, 2004.

== Awards ==
Literature and Criticism New Writer's Award (《문학과비평》 신인상, 1989)

Dong-A Daily New Writer's Contest for "Han chakan namjaui bulhaeng" (한 착한 남자의 불행 A Good Man's Unhappiness) (1992)

== Other information ==
- Kang, Sanghui. "Poetry of Memory and Symbolism, That World Without Hope: The Poetry of Yoo Ha and Park Cheong-ho." 추억과 상징의 시, 그 희망 없음의 세계-유하․박청호론 Literature and Society (November 1995): 1914-1930.
- Kim, Chunsik. "Writing as Disillusionment, Suppression, and Revenge: On Park Cheong-ho's Works." 환멸ㆍ억압ㆍ복수로서의 글쓰기 - 박청호론 Literature and Society (August 1996): 1335-1349.
- U, Chanje. "Between 'Playful Despair' and 'Desperate Play': Reading Park Cheong-ho." 장난스러운 절망'과 '절망적인 장난' 사이에서 - 박청호 읽기 Literature and Society (August 1996): 1322-1334.
- Son, Jeongsu. "Three Examples of Writing Hiding and Revealing Human Desire through Novels: The Novels of Jo Gyeongran, Park Cheong-ho, and Song Gyeonga." 글쓰기가 감추고 드러내는 인간의 욕망에 대한 소설적 탐구의 세 가지 사례 고찰 - 조경란 『가족의 기원』, 박청호『소년 소녀를 만나다』, 송경아『테러리스트 Quarterly Fiction and Philosophy (June 1999): 289-301.
- Seo, Jaewon. "The New Generation's Avant-Garde and Classic Storytellers: Book Reviews of Park Cheong-ho's Gaengseuteoseu paradaiseu and Kim Jonggwang's Gyeongchalseoyeo, annyeong." Monthly Literature & Thought (November 2000): 261-265.
- Park, Cheong-ho, and Seongsil Choe. "Living from the Borderlands of Death, or Surviving Conversations." Literature and Society (August 1996): 1350–59.
- Moonji Publisher's introduction on Park Cheong-ho.
