= Aaron Clauset =

American computer scientist

- Born: United States
- Education: Haverford College and University of New Mexico
- Known for: Power law, Community structure, Metascience
- Awards: Erdös-Rényi Prize in Network Science
- Scientific career
- Fields: Computer science, Physics, Computational social science, and Computational biology
- Workplaces: University of Colorado Boulder and Santa Fe Institute
- Doctoral advisor: Cristopher Moore
- Website: aaronclauset.github.io

Aaron Clauset is an American computer scientist who works in the areas of Network Science, Machine Learning, and Complex Systems. He is currently a professor of computer science at the University of Colorado Boulder and is external faculty at the Santa Fe Institute.

== Education ==
Clauset completed his undergraduate studies in physics and computer science at Haverford College in 2001. He earned his Ph.D. in Computer Science in 2006 from the University of New Mexico under the supervision of Cristopher Moore. He was then an Omidyar Fellow at the Santa Fe Institute until 2010.

== Career ==
In 2010, he joined the University of Colorado Boulder as an assistant professor, with primary appointments in the Computer Science Department and the BioFrontiers Institute, an interdisciplinary institute focused on quantitative systems biology. He joined the founding editorial board of Science Advances as an Associate Editor in 2014, and became the Deputy Editor responsible for social and interdisciplinary sciences in 2017. At the University of Colorado Boulder, he was awarded tenure and promoted to associate professor in 2018, and promoted to full professor in 2022.

Clauset is best known for work done with Cosma Shalizi and Mark Newman in 2009 on developing rigorous statistics tests for the presence of a power law pattern in empirical data, and for showing that many distributions that were claimed to be power laws actually were not. In 2019, he used these techniques to show that most real-world networks do not exhibit the predicted power-law degree distribution of the popular scale-free network model in network science. He is also known for his work on developing algorithms for detecting community structure in complex networks, particularly a model of hierarchical clustering in networks developed with Cristopher Moore and Mark Newman. In other work, Clauset is known for his specific discovery, with Maxwell Young and Kristian Skrede Gleditsch, that the frequency and severity of terrorist events worldwide follows a power-law distribution. This discovery was summarized by Nate Silver in his popular science book The Signal and the Noise and discussed by Steven Pinker in his controversial book Better Angels of our Nature. Since 2015, Clauset has been active in the metascience community, contributing a number of studies of scientific careers, and the role of prestige in shaping productivity, prominence, attrition, and the spread of ideas.

In January 2020, Clauset's work on scale-free networks and the distribution of terrorist events garnered public attention after two of his papers were cited in the blog of British political advisor Dominic Cummings. The blog post was released as part of an advertisement searching for "data scientists, project managers, policy experts, assorted weirdos", with Clauset's papers being cited as examples of work potential candidates should be aware of for use in public policy. In response, Clauset stated that the "paper on scale-free networks is not directly relevant to government policy ... Cummings is using our paper as an example of using careful statistical and computational analyses of large and diverse data sets to reassess ideas that may be accepted as conventional wisdom." Clauset added that "in many cases, we don't understand causality well enough to formulate a policy that will not do more damage than good."

== Awards and honors ==
In 2015, Clauset received a prestigious CAREER Award from the National Science Foundation to develop and evaluate new methods for characterizing the structure of networks. In 2016, Clauset received the Erdös-Rényi Prize in Network Science from the Network Science Society for his contributions to the study of network structure, including Internet mapping, inference of missing links, and community structure, and for his provocative analyses of human conflicts and social stratification. In 2021, a paper he coauthored on "The unequal impact of parenthood in academia" was awarded the "Paper of the Year" recognition by the International Society for Scientometrics and Informetrics (ISSI). He was named a Fellow of the Network Science Society in 2023, and was elected as a Fellow of the American Association for the Advancement of Science (AAAS) in 2025.

== Personal life ==
Aaron Clauset was a contestant on the fourth season of the NBC reality television show Average Joe: The Joe Strikes Back, which aired in 2005. From 2002 to 2016, he wrote a blog Structure+Strangeness on science, complex systems, and computation.

== Selected publications ==
- Clauset, Aaron; Newman, M. E. J.; Moore, Cristopher (2004), "Finding community structure in very large networks" (PDF), Physical Review E, 70 (6) 066111, arXiv:cond-mat/0408187, Bibcode:2004PhRvE..70f6111C, doi:10.1103/PhysRevE.70.066111, PMID 15697438, S2CID 8977721.
- Achlioptas, Dimitris; Clauset, Aaron; Kempe, David; Moore, Cristopher (2005), "On the bias of traceroute sampling: or, power-law degree distributions in regular graphs", Proceedings of the 37th ACM Symposium on Theory of Computing (STOC '05), pp. 694–703, arXiv:cond-mat/0503087, doi:10.1145/1060590.1060693, S2CID 785270.
- Clauset, Aaron; Young, Maxwell; Gleditsch, Kristian S. (2007), "On the frequency of severe terrorist attacks", Journal of Conflict Resolution, 51 (1): 58–88, arXiv:physics/0606007, doi:10.1177/0022002706296157, S2CID 2922681.
- Clauset, Aaron; Moore, Cristopher; Newman, M. E. J. (2008), "Hierarchical structure and the prediction of missing links in networks" (PDF), Nature, 453 (7191): 98–101, arXiv:0811.0484, Bibcode:2008Natur.453...98C, doi:10.1038/nature06830, hdl:2027.42/62623, PMID 18451861, S2CID 278058.
- Clauset, Aaron; Erwin, Douglas H. (2008), "The evolution and distribution of species body size", Science, 321 (5887): 399–401, arXiv:0901.0251, Bibcode:2008Sci...321..399C, doi:10.1126/science.1157534, PMID 18635801, S2CID 13067181.
- Clauset, Aaron; Shalizi, Cosma R.; Newman, M. E. J. (2009), "Power-law distributions in empirical data", SIAM Review, 51 (4): 661–703, arXiv:0706.1062, Bibcode:2009SIAMR..51..661C, doi:10.1137/070710111, S2CID 9155618.
- Clauset, Aaron; Arbesman, Samuel; Larremore, Daniel B. (2015), "Systematic inequality and hierarchy in faculty hiring networks", Science Advances, 1 (1) e1400005, Bibcode:2015SciA....1E0005S, doi:10.1126/sciadv.1400005, PMC 4644075, PMID 26601125.
- Morgan, Allison C.; Way, Samuel F.; Hoefer, Michael J.D.; Larremore, Daniel B.; Galesic, Mirta; Clauset, Aaron (2021), "The unequal impact of parenthood in academia", Science Advances, 7 (8) eabd1996, Bibcode:2021SciA....7.1996M, doi:10.1126/sciadv.abd1996, PMC 7904257, PMID 33627417.
