= Neutral network =

Neutral network may refer to:

- Net neutrality, a concept of fair internet network availability
- Neutral network (evolution)
- Neutral network (robust), a concept in network connectivity robustness
- Neutral network (uncorrelated), a concept in network connectivity balance
