= Zachary's karate club =

Social network

A network representation of social relationships among the 34 individuals in the karate club studied by Zachary.

Zachary's karate club is a social network of a university karate club, described in the paper "An Information Flow Model for Conflict and Fission in Small Groups" by Wayne W. Zachary. The network became a popular example of community structure in networks after its use by Michelle Girvan and Mark Newman in 2002.

== Network description ==
A social network of a karate club was studied by Wayne W. Zachary for a period of three years from 1970 to 1972. The network captures 34 members of a karate club, documenting links between pairs of members who interacted outside the club. During the study a conflict arose between the administrator "John A" and instructor "Mr. Hi" (pseudonyms), which led to the split of the club into two. Half of the members formed a new club around Mr. Hi; members from the other part found a new instructor or gave up karate. Based on collected data Zachary correctly assigned all but one member of the club to the groups they actually joined after the split.

== Zachary's methodology ==
Before the split each side tried to recruit adherents of the other party. Thus, communication flow had a special importance and the initial group would likely split at the "borders" of the network. Zachary used the maximum flow – minimum cut Ford–Fulkerson algorithm from “source” Mr. Hi to “sink” John A: the cut closest to Mr. Hi that cuts saturated edges divides the network into the two factions. Zachary correctly predicted each member's decision except member #9, who went with Mr. Hi instead of John A.

== Data set ==
The standard 78-edge network data set for Zachary's karate club is publicly available on the internet. The data can be summarized as list of integer pairs. Each integer represents one karate club member and a pair indicates the two members interacted. The data set is summarized below and also in the adjoining image. Node 1 stands for the instructor, node 34 for the club administrator / president.

[2 1]
[3 1] [3 2]
[4 1] [4 2] [4 3]
[5 1]
[6 1]
[7 1] [7 5] [7 6]
[8 1] [8 2] [8 3] [8 4]
[9 1] [9 3]
[10 3]
[11 1] [11 5] [11 6]
[12 1]
[13 1] [13 4]
[14 1] [14 2] [14 3] [14 4]
[17 6] [17 7]
[18 1] [18 2]
[20 1] [20 2]
[22 1] [22 2]
[26 24] [26 25]
[28 3] [28 24] [28 25]
[29 3]
[30 24] [30 27]
[31 2] [31 9]
[32 1] [32 25] [32 26] [32 29]
[33 3] [33 9] [33 15] [33 16] [33 19] [33 21] [33 23] [33 24] [33 30] [33 31] [33 32]
[34 9] [34 10] [34 14] [34 15] [34 16] [34 19] [34 20] [34 21] [34 23] [34 24] [34 27] [34 28] [34 29] [34 30] [34 31] [34 32] [34 33]

Although this version of the network is considered standard, the connection between nodes 34 and 23 is ambiguously reported in Zachary's original paper. A 77-edge version, which omits this edge, is also publicly available.

== Zachary Karate Club Club ==
Zachary Karate Club Club is an honorific group of scientists who have used Zachary's Karate Club as an example in a scientific presentation. At any conference on networks, the first scientist to use Zachary's Karate Club as an example network may be awarded membership to the group and a prize. The prize, a karate trophy, is presented to the newest member by the previous prize holder. The first scientist to be awarded was Cristopher Moore in 2013, at a conference at the Santa Fe Institute.

=== ZKCC Trophy recipients ===
- 25th Marco Fernandez da Silva (June 2026)
- 24th Arash Badie-Modiri (June 2025)
- 23rd Nicholas Landry (June 2024)
- 22nd Luca Gallo (July 2023)
- 21st Santo Fortunato (July 2022)
- 20th Jesús Arroyo (July 2021)
- 19th Jean-Gabriel Young (September 2020)
- 18th Emma Towlson (May 2019)
- 17th Philipp Hövel (March 2019)
- 16th Clara Granell (September 2018)
- 15th Leto Peel (June 2018)
- 14th Aric Hagberg (March 2018)
- 13th Megha Padi (March 2018)
- 12th Amir Rubin (January 2017)
- 11th Federico Battiston (September 2016)
- 10th Giona Casiraghi (July 2016)
- 9th Filippo Radicchi (May 2016)
- 8th Qing Ke (September 2015)
- 7th Manlio De Domenico (July 2015)
- 6th Tiago Peixoto (June 2015)
- 5th Mark Newman (June 2014)
- 4th Marián Boguñá (September 2013)
- 3rd YY Ahn (July 2013)
- 2nd Mason Porter (June 2013)
- 1st Cristopher Moore (May 2013)
