= Nigerians =

People of Nigeria

- Flag of Nigeria

Regions with significant populations
- Nigeria: 233,668,528
- Benin: 6,000,000
- Cameroon: 4,000,000
- Ghana: 1,000,000
- United States: 858,236 (ancestry or ethnic origin)
- United Kingdom: 312,000 (2021) – 500,000 (2023)
- Niger: 155,000
- Canada: 111,465
- Italy: 106,069
- Germany: 100,000
- Chad: 88,000
- Saudi Arabia: 79,547 (2022 census)
- Central African Republic: 60,000
- Chile: 60,000
- Spain: 60,000
- Mexico: 50,000
- India: 50,000
- Ivory Coast: 44,791
- South Africa: 36,500+
- Togo: 500,000
- France: 30,000
- Gabon: 24,000
- Ireland: 20,559
- Netherlands: 20,000
- Austria: 19,286
- United Arab Emirates: 16,000
- Sweden: 11,326
- Brazil: 8,101
- Burkina Faso: 5,000
- Kuwait: 5,000
- Mozambique: 5,000
- Australia: 4,519
- Liberia: 4,000
- Mali: 4,000
- Qatar: 4,000
- Portugal: 3,000
- Finland: 4,853
- Greece: 3,000
- Japan: 3,000
- Bahrain: 2,000
- Senegal: 2,000
- South Korea: 2,000
- Norway: 1,780
- Belgium: 1,636
- Argentina: 1,535
- Gambia: 8,104

Languages
- Nigerian English, regional languages

Religion
- Islam, Christianity, Traditional African religions

Nigerians are the citizens and nationals of Nigeria, as well as people with ancestry from there. The name Nigeria was derived from the Niger River running through the country. This name was allegedly coined in the late 19th century by British journalist Flora Shaw, who later married Baron Frederick Lugard, a British colonial administrator. Nigeria is composed of various ethnic groups and cultures and the term Nigerian refers to a citizenship-based civic nationality. Though there are multiple ethnic groups in Nigeria, economic factors result in significant mobility of Nigerians of multiple ethnic and religious backgrounds to reside in territories in Nigeria that are outside their ethnic or religious background, resulting in the mixing of the various ethnic and religious groups, especially in Nigeria's cities. The English language is the lingua franca of Nigerians. Nigeria is divided roughly in half between Muslims, who live mostly in the north, and Christians, who live mostly in the south; indigenous religions, such as those native to the Ibibio, Efik, Igbo and Yoruba ethnicities, are in the minority.

== Ethnicity ==
Nigerians come from multiple ethnic, cultural and religious backgrounds as the founding of Nigeria was the outcome of a colonial creation by the British Empire.

== History ==
There have been several major historical kingdoms and states in Nigeria that have influenced Nigerian society through their kings and their legal and taxation systems, and the use of religion to legitimize the power of the king and to unite the people. Northern Nigeria has been culturally influenced by Islam, including several major historic Islamic states in the region. The Songhai Empire, Kanem-Bornu Empire and the Sokoto Caliphate were major historical Islamic states in northern Nigeria. Southern Nigeria historically held several powerful states, including the Benin Empire, Ibibio Kingdom, Efik Kingdom, Oyo Empire, and Aro Confederacy.

== Culture ==
Nigerian culture was profoundly affected by the British colonial rule. Such as British colonial authority's denouncement and attacks upon polygamy, trial by ordeal, and certain types of sacrifices. At the same time, British colonial authorities maintained and promoted traditional Nigerian culture that strengthened colonial administration. The British spread Christianity throughout southern Nigeria and Christian missionaries assisted British authorities in establishing a Western-style education system in Nigeria that resulted in the teaching of English language in Nigeria and its subsequent adoption as Nigeria's main language. The British replaced unpaid household labor with wage labour. Prior to colonisation in the twentieth century, Nigeria's tribes usually possessed the land as a community, such that land could not be bought or sold. Colonisation brought the notion of individuals owning land and the commercialisation of land began.

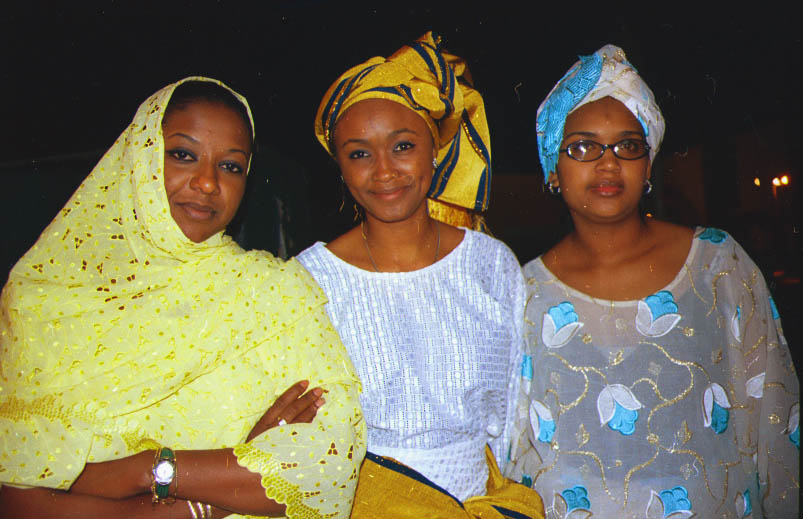
Hausa Nigerian women, wearing traditional clothing

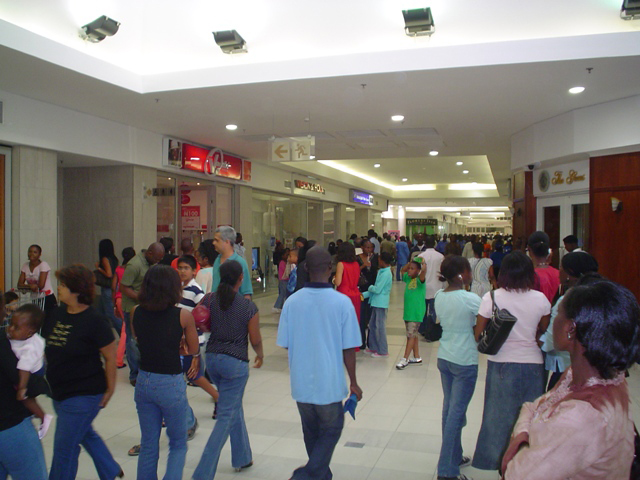
Nigerians shopping in a mall in Lagos

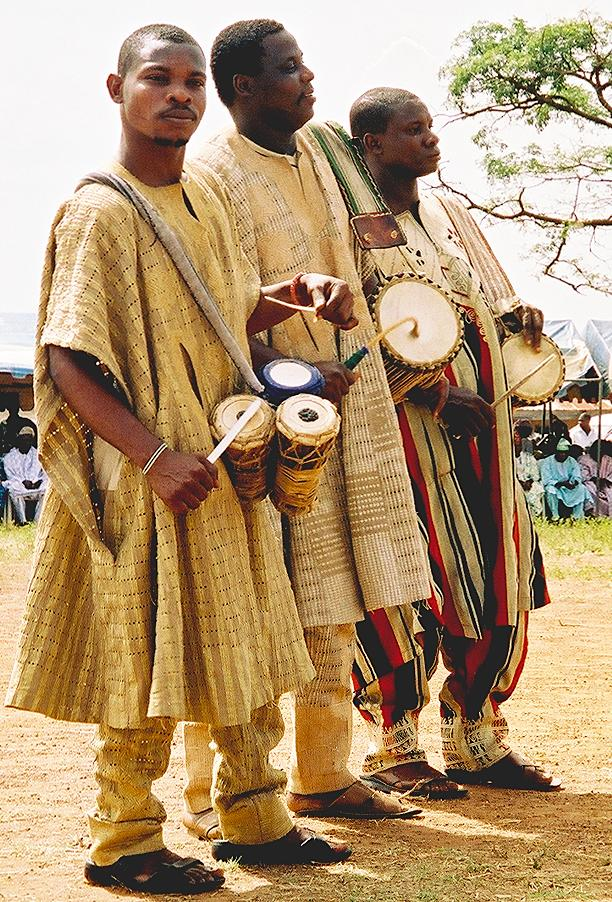
Yoruba Nigerian men of Kwara origin, wearing traditional clothing and playing drums

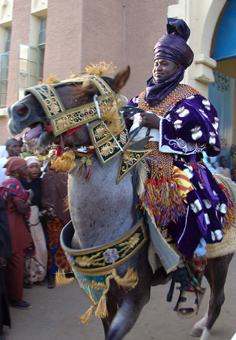
Horseman at the Kano Durbar festival

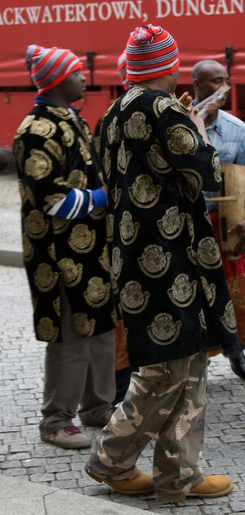
Igbo Nigerian men, wearing the modern Isiagu with traditional Igbo men's hat

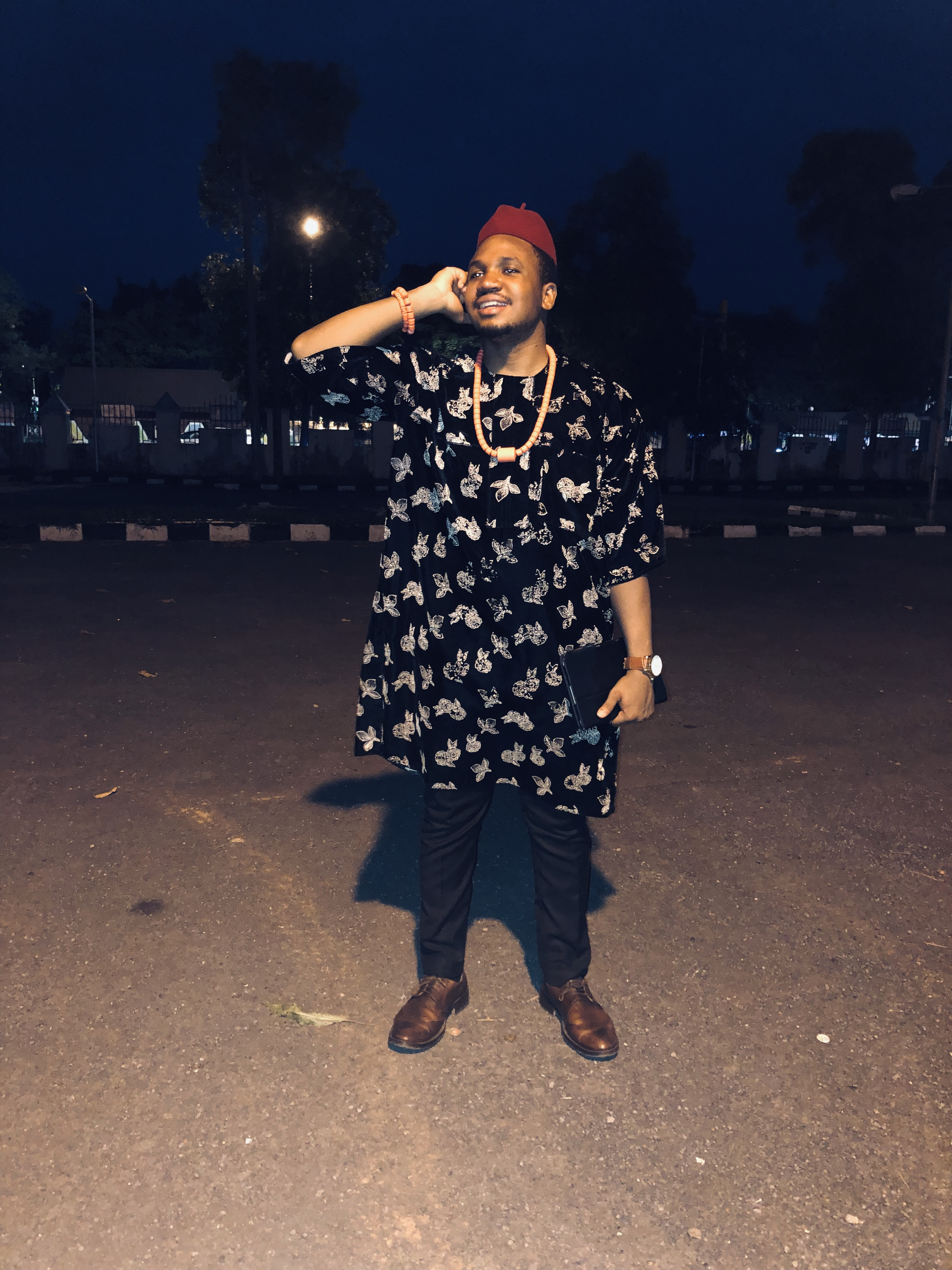
An Igbo man in his cultural attire

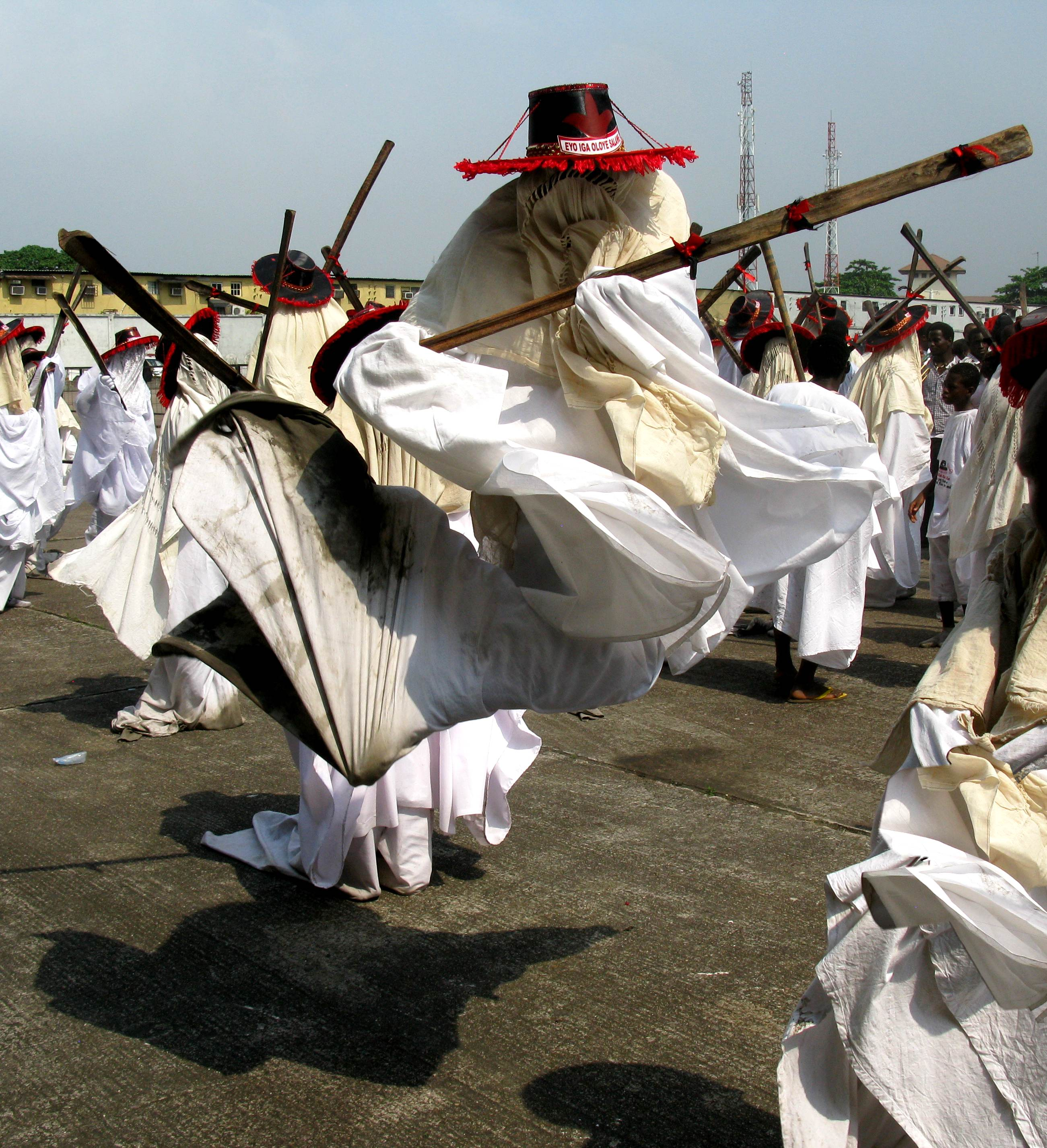
An Eyo Iga Olowe Salaye masquerade jumping

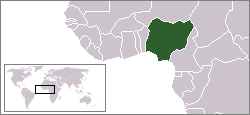
Map of west Africa, showing Nigeria in dark green

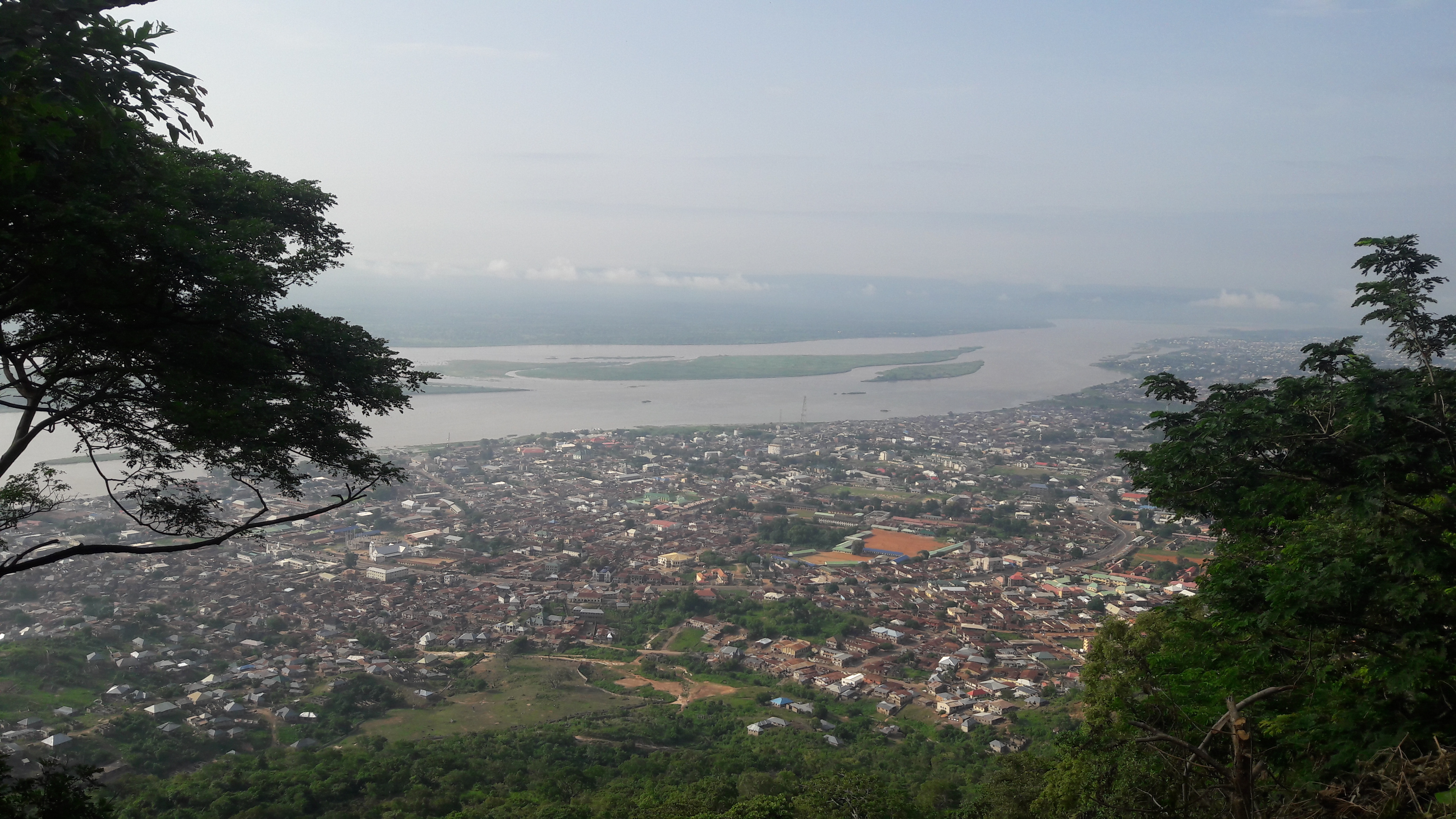
A view of lokoja on top of hill Mount Patti. Kogi state

In Nigeria, more than fifty percent of Nigerians live in villages of two different types: the first type used by the Igbo, Ibibio and Tiv involves a collection of dispersed compounds while the second type used amongst the Hausa-Fulani, Yoruba, and Kanuri involves nuclei of compounds. These villages compose members of the ethnicity-related through ancestry as well as strangers who have been assimilated into the ethnicity. Since the time prior to colonisation to the present it has been a common practice of Nigeria's tribes to adopt strangers into the tribes. A male elder in the community commonly serves as a village chief or head.

In the large cities of Nigeria, there is a substantial intermingling of Nigerians with foreigners, especially Europeans, Lebanese, and Indians. The economic importance of Nigeria's cities has resulted in migrations of people from their traditional ethnic or cultural homeland to cities outside those territories. Igbo, Hausa-Fulani and Ibibio people have commonly migrated to Lagos and many southerners migrate to the north to trade or work while a number of northern seasonal workers and small-scale entrepreneurs go to the south.

== Religions ==
There are two main religions in Nigeria, which are Islam and Christianity, they have both made significant impact on the making of African societies, and played significant roles in such a multi-religious country like Nigeria. There are also other religions practised in Nigeria.

- Muslim 53.5%
- Christian 45.9%
- Other 0.6%

== Sectarianism ==
Ethnic, religious, and regional disputes and tensions have commonly divided Nigerians on political issues. In particular, cultural and political divisions between the Muslim north and the Christian south has politicised religion and caused significant political disputes in Nigeria. Ethnic-motivated and religious-motivated violence by extremists has increased these tensions as well.

However, despite instances of extremism, most Nigerians continue to peacefully coexist, and a common Nigerian identity has been fostered amongst the more educated and affluent Nigerians as well as with the many Nigerians who leave small homogeneous ethnic communities to seek economic opportunities in the cities where the population is ethnically mixed. Although there are cultural divisions amongst Nigerians, the English language is commonly used as their primary language. Also, most Nigerians share a strong commitment to individual liberties and democracy. Even during periods of military rule, such military governments were pressured to maintain democratic stances by the Nigerian people. Nigeria's political figures are commonly known as multiple indigenous languages outside their own indigenous language.

== See also ==
- British Nigerian
- Demographics of Nigeria
- Nigerian Americans
- List of Nigerians
