= Park Seong-won =

Park Seong-won or Pak Song-won (Korean: 박성원) may refer to:

- Park Seongwon (writer) (born 1969)
- Park Sung-won (swimmer) (born 1972)

== See also ==
- Park (Korean surname), for other people with the same family name
- Sung-won, for other people with the same given name
