= Intermingling =

Interactions between individuals that go against a particular society's cultural norms

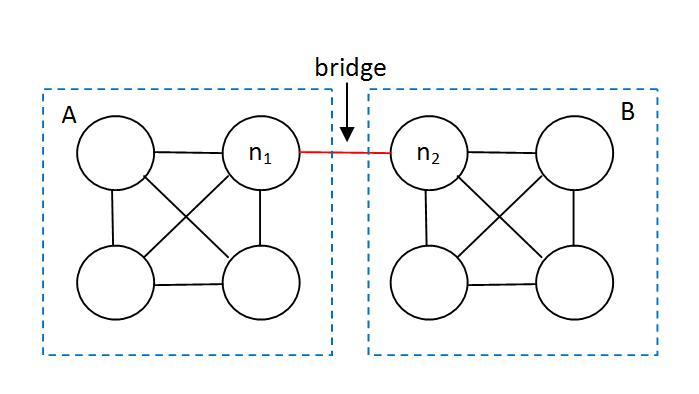
A bridge between two individuals who have no previous connection leads to intermingling.

Intermingling, or heterophily, from a sociological perspective includes the various forms of interactions between individuals that go against a particular society's cultural norms. These relationships stem from weak or absent ties, which are contrary to strong ties and constitute of networks between individuals who know little or nothing about one another. Examples of intermingling can include networking, work-place romance, or cross-cultural dating.

== Overview ==
Intermingling is the opposite of homophily and xenophobia but individuals tend to be less heterophilic and more homophilic - associating and bonding with individuals similar to themselves. Homophily is more prevalent than heterophily because the strength of all ties between any two people depend on the amount of time spent together, of mutual confiding, and of emotional intensity. Homophilic relationships are perceived to be easier to build and maintain as individuals feel they have a great deal in common.

Pertaining to the diffusion of relationships, intermingling and heterophily are perceived to create more damage. Thus, since individuals practice homophily tend to be strongly connected and hold strong ties between their groups, when an individual is removed from the group information is still passed easily among those who remain. Contrarily, in sectors where there is intermingling and the group fabricates weak ties and bridges (individuals who connect two strangers) the removal of an individual from this group threatens the continuation of relationships between the others left in the group.

== Networking ==
Personal networks and business networks are the social circles individuals find themselves within that are made up of strong and weak ties. The goal of these networks is to exchange information, act upon new opportunities, and have personal gain from the relationship. Intermingling has been known to enhance individuals' networking practices as heterophily is said to make people more successful through them being able to receive new information from weak ties. This conclusion comes from the observation of those who are perceived to be privileged and unprivileged (based on race, class, and gender) and how much in comparison to the other each group intermingles thus creating weak ties. The unprivileged groups (i.e. women, minorities, and lower classes) tend to be in small cliques with a very limited amount of weak ties meaning that their access to new opportunities and information is also limited. These groups have been known to only interact with each other causing information to be trapped within their own circle and no new information to enter into the circle. In Stanley Milgram's Small World Problem this breach in the spread of new information is described as group inbreeding.

=== Relationship diffusion ===
According to Mark Granovetter in his work the Strength of Weak Ties, intermingling is necessary in gaining access to new opportunities and personal gain as weak ties increase an individual's exposure to new information. Additionally, Granovetter's work found that information diffuses (spreads) more quickly and further when the network is made up of weak ties and bridges (individuals who connect two strangers). This is benefiting to individuals as information usually contain information on employment, business opportunities, and new ventures.

== In romantic relationships ==
Intermingling is a term sometimes used to refer to several different ideas regarding how people connect in love intermarriage, cultural assimilation, miscegenation (racial mixing). Note that the history of cultural exchange and inter-societal conflict has produced terms for "intermingling" concepts which are colored by various cultural and societal norms such as xenophobia and racism.

=== Within the workplace ===
Intermingling in the workplace is considered and commonly called workplace romance. Intermingling within the workplace is considered a sexual attraction between two individuals who work within the same organization and the relationship is perceived within the eyes of a third party. Workplace romance is deemed a form of intermingling because they are usually not approved or allowed by company officials leading it to be taboo dating practice.

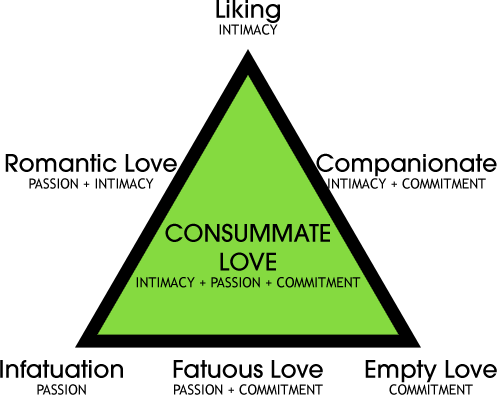
Triangular Theory of Love components

The interactions that take place within the workplace are romantically charges as both individuals are voluntarily involved and the mingling that takes place is not forced or unwanted. Additionally the individuals are officially labeled as more than just co-workers once they act physically on their mutual romantic feelings for each other. This may come in the form of dating or casual sex.

Confirmation of intermingling within the workplace context also must support Sternberg's triangular theory of love which states that loving relationships consist of three components; intimacy (which attracts the individuals to each other), passion (which causes the need to express feelings through physical attention and sexual intercourse), and commitment (which leads to the individuals deciding to stick with each other).

==== Types of workplace romances ====
Relationships formed within the workplace are one of three types; hierarchical, lateral, or couples without direct interaction in their job description.

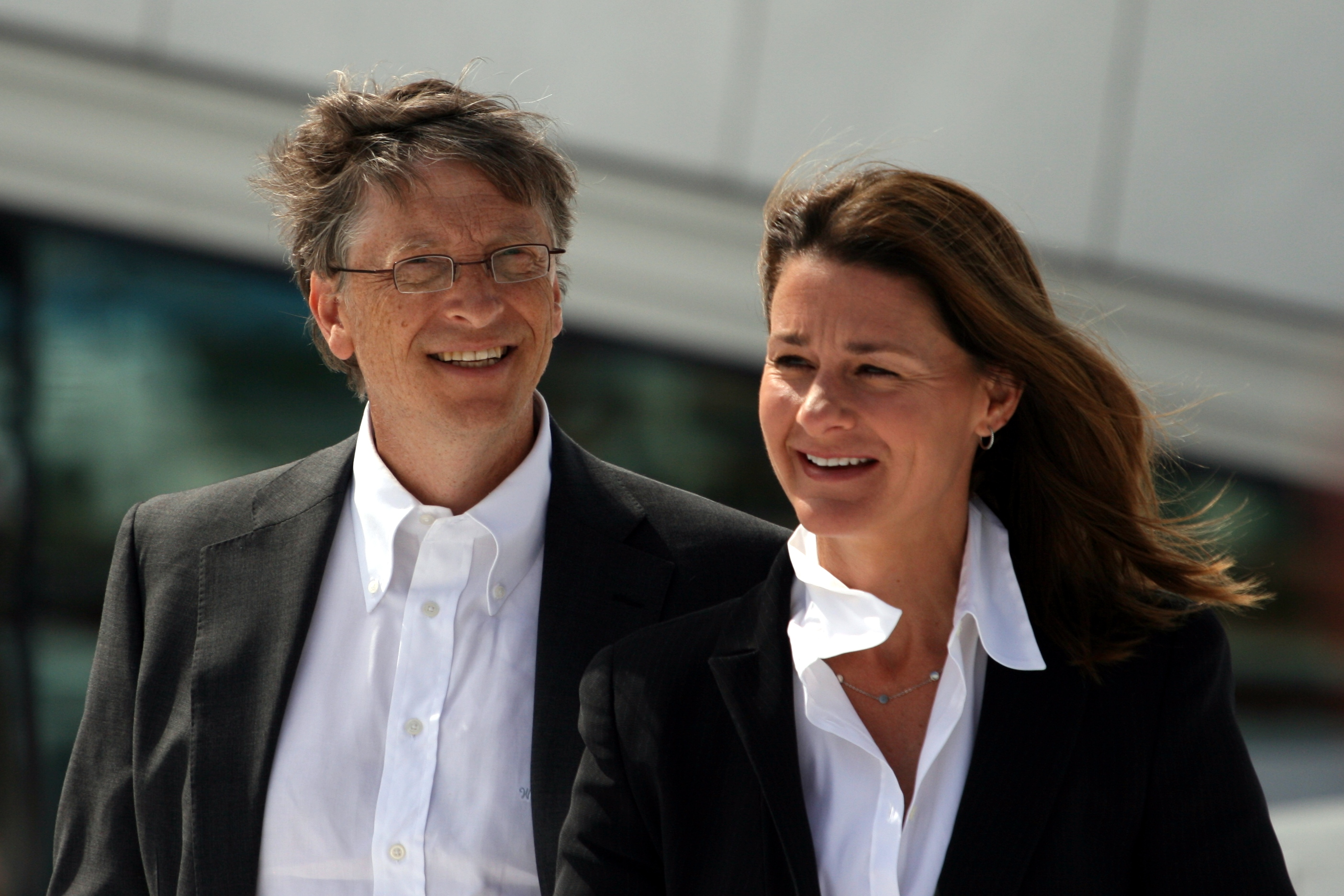
Bill and Melinda Gates

Relationships that are hierarchal within the place of employment happen when the involved individuals do not hold the same power in the context of their work. One individual's job position is seen as subordinate when compared to their significant other's position within the same company. Famous examples of hierarchal romances include Bill Gates (CEO of Microsoft) and Melinda French (previous Product Manager of Microsoft), President Barack Obama (previous Summer Associate at Sidley Austin - Chicago Branch) and Michelle Robinson (Barack's Summer Mentor/Advisor) see Obama - Family Life, and the notorious romance between President Bill Clinton and Monica Lewinsky (White House Intern) see Lewinsky scandal.

Relationships that are lateral within the workplace are formed when the involved individuals are seen as holding equally powerful positions in their job descriptions. Persons participating in a lateral workplace romance can not be seen as superior or subordinate to one another.

Leaders of organizations favor lateral relationships more than hierarchal relationships even though neither are fully supported. The dynamics of hierarchal relationships within the work context can possibly lead to a higher number of claims of sexual harassment. The Meritor Savings Bank v. Vinson case, which claimed that workplace romances are not excluded in the Title VII of the Civil Rights Act of 1964, established that employers are responsible for the actions executed to their employees by the power-holding leaders of the institution.

Also, hierarchal relationships can lead to conflict as the subordinate individual begins to be viewed by their co-workers as more favored than their equals. This favor is symbolized through pay raises, promotions, transfers, work load discrepancies and it usually leads to co-workers envying one another or carrying feelings of inequality.

Couples who work for the same institution but have no direct interaction during their tasks at work may be two individuals who work in different departments or different sites. This form of dating stirs even less suspicions of favoritism than lateral and hierarchical forms of dating.
