= Mark Newman =

British physicist

- Born: Bristol, England
- Education: Merton College, Oxford
- Scientific career
- Fields: Physics
- Workplaces: University of Michigan; Santa Fe Institute
- Doctoral advisor: David Sherrington

Mark Newman FRS is a British physicist and Anatol Rapoport Distinguished University Professor of Physics at the University of Michigan, as well as an external faculty member of the Santa Fe Institute. He is known for his fundamental contributions to the fields of complex systems and complex networks, for which he was awarded the APS Kadanoff Prize in 2024 and the SIAM John von Neumann Prize in 2026.

== Career ==
Mark Newman grew up in Bristol, England, where he attended Bristol Cathedral School, and earned both an undergraduate degree and PhD in physics from the University of Oxford, before moving to the United States to conduct research first at Cornell University and later at the Santa Fe Institute. In 2002 Newman moved to the University of Michigan, where he is currently the Anatol Rapoport Distinguished University Professor of Physics and a professor in the university's Center for the Study of Complex Systems.

== Research ==
Newman is known for his research on complex networks, and in particular for work on random graph theory, assortative mixing, community structure, percolation theory, collaboration patterns of scientists, and network epidemiology. In early work in collaboration with Steven Strogatz and Duncan Watts, he developed the theory of the configuration model, one of the standard models of network science, and associated mathematical methods based on probability generating functions. Around the same time he also popularized the concept of community structure in networks and the community detection problem, and worked on mixing patterns and assortativity in networks, both in collaboration with Michelle Girvan. In network epidemiology he published both on formal results, particularly concerning the connection between the SIR model and percolation, as well as practical applications to infections such as SARS, pneumonia, and group B strep. In later work he has focused on spectral graph theory and random matrices, belief propagation methods, and network reconstruction, among other things.

Newman has also worked on a range of topics outside of network theory in the general area of statistical physics, particularly on spin models and on percolation, where he is the inventor (with Robert Ziff) of the Newman-Ziff algorithm for computer simulation of percolation systems. Outside of physics he has published papers in mathematics, computer science, statistics, biology, ecology, epidemiology, paleontology, and sociology. He has worked particularly on so-called power-law distributions, which govern the statistics of a wide range of systems from human populations and earthquakes to spoken languages and solar flares. With Aaron Clauset and Cosma Shalizi, Newman developed statistical methods for analyzing power-law distributions and applied them to a wide range of systems, in various cases either confirming or refuting previously claimed power-law behaviors. In other work, he was also the inventor, with Michael Gastner, of a method for generating density-equalizing maps or cartograms. Their work gained attention following the 2004 US presidential election when it was used as the basis for a widely circulated set of maps of the election results.

Newman's work is unusually well cited. A 2019 Stanford University study ranked Newman as having the third highest citation impact of any active scientist in the world in any field, and the 28th highest of all time, out of 6.8 million scientists worldwide. In 2021 Newman was named a Clarivate Citation Laureate, a distinction that recognizes scientists who have had "research influence comparable to that of Nobel Prize recipients". In the ten years following its publication, Newman's 2003 paper "The structure and function of complex networks" was the most highly cited paper in the entire field of mathematics.

== Awards and honors ==
Newman is a Fellow of the Royal Society, Fellow of the American Physical Society, Fellow of the American Association for the Advancement of Science, Fellow of the Network Science Society, a Simons Foundation Fellow, and a Guggenheim Fellow. He was the recipient of the 2014 Lagrange Prize from the ISI Foundation, the 2021 Euler Award of the Network Science Society, the 2024 Leo P. Kadanoff Prize of the American Physical Society, and the 2026 John von Neumann Prize from the Society for Industrial and Applied Mathematics.

== See also ==
- Random graph
- Assortative mixing

== Selected publications ==
=== Books ===
- J. J. Binney; A. J. Fisher; N. J. Dowrick & M. E. J. Newman (1992). The Theory of Critical Phenomena. Oxford: Oxford University Press.
- M. E. J. Newman & G. T. Barkema (1999). Monte Carlo Methods in Statistical Physics. Oxford: Oxford University Press. ISBN 0-19-851796-3.
- Mark Newman; Albert-László Barabási & Duncan J. Watts (2006). Structure and Dynamics of Networks. Princeton, NJ: Princeton University Press.
- Daniel Dorling, Mark Newman & Anna Barford (2008). The Atlas of the Real World. London: Thames & Hudson Ltd. ISBN 978-0-500-51425-2.
- M. E. J. Newman (2010). Networks: An Introduction. Oxford: Oxford University Press. ISBN 978-0-19-920665-0. Second edition, September 2018. ISBN 978-0198805090.

=== Articles ===
- M. E. J. Newman (2001). "The structure of scientific collaboration networks". Proceedings of the National Academy of Sciences. 98 (2): 404–409. arXiv:cond-mat/0007214. Bibcode:2001PNAS...98..404N. doi:10.1073/pnas.021544898. PMC 14598. PMID 11149952.
- M. E. J. Newman; S. H. Strogatz; D. J. Watts (2001). "Random graphs with arbitrary degree distributions and their applications". Physical Review E. 64 (2) 026118. arXiv:cond-mat/0007235. Bibcode:2001PhRvE..64b6118N. doi:10.1103/PhysRevE.64.026118. PMID 11497662. S2CID 360112.
- M. E. J. Newman (2002). "Assortative mixing in networks". Physical Review Letters. 89 (20) 208701. arXiv:cond-mat/0205405. Bibcode:2002PhRvL..89t8701N. doi:10.1103/PhysRevLett.89.208701. PMID 12443515. S2CID 1574486.
- M. E. J. Newman (2003). "The structure and function of complex networks". SIAM Review. 45 (2): 167–256. arXiv:cond-mat/0303516. Bibcode:2003SIAMR..45..167N. doi:10.1137/S003614450342480. S2CID 221278130.
- M. T. Gastner; M. E. J. Newman (2004). "Diffusion-based method for producing density equalizing maps". Proceedings of the National Academy of Sciences. 101 (20): 7499–7504. arXiv:physics/0401102. Bibcode:2004PNAS..101.7499G. doi:10.1073/pnas.0400280101. PMC 419634. PMID 15136719.
- M. E. J. Newman (2006). "Modularity and community structure in networks". Proceedings of the National Academy of Sciences. 103 (23): 8577–8582. arXiv:physics/0602124. Bibcode:2006PNAS..103.8577N. doi:10.1073/pnas.0601602103. PMC 1482622. PMID 16723398.
- Newman, MEJ (2005). "Power laws, Pareto distributions and Zipf's law" (PDF). Contemporary Physics. 46 (5): 323–351. arXiv:cond-mat/0412004. Bibcode:2005ConPh..46..323N. doi:10.1080/00107510500052444. S2CID 202719165.
- Newman, Mark E. J. (June 2003). "The structure and function of complex networks". SIAM Review. 45 (2): 167–256. arXiv:cond-mat/0303516. Bibcode:2003SIAMR..45..167N. doi:10.1137/S003614450342480. S2CID 221278130.
- Clauset, Aaron; Moore, Christopher; Newman, M.E.J. (1 May 2008). "Hierarchical structure and the prediction of missing links in networks". Nature. 453 (7191): 98–101. arXiv:0811.0484. Bibcode:2008Natur.453...98C. doi:10.1038/nature06830. hdl:2027.42/62623. PMID 18451861. S2CID 278058.
- Newman, M.E.J. (29 May 2006). "Power laws, Pareto distributions and Zipf's law". Contemporary Physics. 46: 323–351. arXiv:cond-mat/0412004. doi:10.1080/00107510500052444. S2CID 2871747.
- Clauset, Aaron; Shazili, Cosma Rohila; Newman, M. E. J. (2 Feb 2009). "Power-law distributions in empirical data". SIAM Review. 51 (4): 661–703. arXiv:0706.1062. Bibcode:2009SIAMR..51..661C. doi:10.1137/070710111. S2CID 9155618.
