= Cristopher Moore =

American computer scientist

- Born: March 12, 1968 (age 58); New Brunswick, New Jersey
- Education: Northwestern University (B.S., 1986); Cornell University (Ph.D., 1991)
- Scientific career
- Fields: Computer Science and Physics
- Workplaces: Santa Fe Institute
- Doctoral advisor: Philip Holmes
- Doctoral students: Aaron Clauset

Cristopher David Moore, known as Cris Moore, (born March 12, 1968, in New Brunswick, New Jersey) is an American computer scientist, mathematician, and physicist. He is resident faculty at the Santa Fe Institute, and was formerly a full professor at the University of New Mexico. He is an elected Fellow of the American Physical Society, the American Mathematical Society, and the American Association for the Advancement of Science.

== Biography ==
Moore did his undergraduate studies at Northwestern University, graduating in 1986. He earned his Ph.D. in 1991 from Cornell University under the supervision of Philip Holmes. After postdoctoral studies at the Santa Fe Institute, he joined the institute as a research faculty member in 1998, and moved to the University of New Mexico in 2000 as an assistant professor. He received tenure there in 2005. In 2007 he became a research professor at the Santa Fe Institute again, while retaining his University of New Mexico affiliation, and in 2008 he was promoted to full professor at UNM. His primary appointment was in the Department of Computer Science, with a joint appointment in the UNM Department of Physics and Astronomy. In 2012, Moore left the University of New Mexico and became full-time resident faculty at the Santa Fe Institute.

Moore has also served on the Santa Fe, New Mexico, city council from 1994 to 2002, affiliated with the Green Party of New Mexico.

== Research ==
In 1993, Moore found a novel solution to the three-body problem, showing that it is possible in Newtonian mechanics for three equal-mass bodies to follow each other around a shared orbit along a figure-eight shaped curve. Moore's results were found through numerical computations, and they were made mathematically rigorous in 2000 by Alain Chenciner and Richard Montgomery and shown computationally to be stable by Carlès Simo. Later researchers showed that similar solutions to the three-body problem are also possible under general relativity, Einstein's more accurate description of the effects of gravitation on moving bodies. After his original work on the problem, Moore collaborated with Michael Nauenberg to find many complex orbits for systems of more than three bodies, including one system in which twelve bodies trace out the four equatorial cycles of a cuboctahedron.

In 2001, Moore and John M. Robson showed that the problem of tiling one polyomino with copies of another is NP-complete.

Moore has also been active in the field of network science, with many notable publications in the field. In work with Aaron Clauset, David Kempe, and Dimitris Achlioptas, Moore showed that the appearance of power laws in the degree distribution of networks can be illusory: network models such as the Erdős–Rényi model, whose degree distribution does not obey a power law, may nevertheless appear to exhibit one when measured using traceroute-like tools. In work with Clauset and Mark Newman, Moore developed a probabilistic model of hierarchical clustering for complex networks, and showed that their model predicts clustering robustly in the face of changes to the link structure of the network.

Other topics in Moore's research include modeling undecidable problems by physical systems, phase transitions in random instances of the Boolean satisfiability problem, the unlikelihood of success in the search for extraterrestrial intelligence due to the indistinguishability of advanced signaling technologies from random noise, the inability of certain types of quantum algorithm to solve graph isomorphism, and attack-resistant quantum cryptography.

== Awards and honors ==
In 2013, Moore became the inaugural member of the Zachary Karate Club Club. In 2014, Moore was elected as a Fellow of the American Physical Society for his fundamental contributions at the interface between nonlinear physics, statistical physics and computer science, including complex network analysis, phase transitions in NP-complete problems, and the computational complexity of physical simulation. In 2015 he was elected as a fellow of the American Mathematical Society. In 2017 he was elected as a Fellow of the American Association for the Advancement of Science, and in 2024, he was named as a Fellow of the Network Science Society.

== Selected publications ==
- Moore, Cristopher (1990), "Unpredictability and undecidability in dynamical systems", Physical Review Letters, 64 (20): 2354–2357, Bibcode:1990PhRvL..64.2354M, doi:10.1103/PhysRevLett.64.2354, PMID 10041691.
- Moore, Cristopher (1993), "Braids in classical dynamics" (PDF), Physical Review Letters, 70 (24): 3675–3679, Bibcode:1993PhRvL..70.3675M, doi:10.1103/PhysRevLett.70.3675, PMID 10053934, archived from the original (PDF) on 2018-10-08.
- Moore, Cristopher; Crutchfield, James P. (2000), "Quantum automata and quantum grammars", Theoretical Computer Science, 237 (1–2): 275–306, arXiv:quant-ph/9707031, doi:10.1016/S0304-3975(98)00191-1, MR 1756213, S2CID 3175396.
- Moore, C.; Robson, J. M. (2001), "Hard tiling problems with simple tiles" (PDF), Discrete and Computational Geometry, 26 (4): 573–590, arXiv:math/0003039, doi:10.1007/s00454-001-0047-6, MR 1863810, S2CID 10710727, archived from the original (PDF) on 2013-06-17.
- Achlioptas, D.; Moore, C. (2002), "The asymptotic order of the random k-SAT threshold", Proceedings of the 43rd IEEE Symposium on Foundations of Computer Science (FOCS '02), pp. 779–788, arXiv:cond-mat/0209622, doi:10.1109/SFCS.2002.1182003, ISBN 0-7695-1822-2, S2CID 5206330.
- Lachmann, Michael; Newman, M. E. J.; Moore, Cristopher (2004), "The physical limits of communication or Why any sufficiently advanced technology is indistinguishable from noise" (PDF), American Journal of Physics, 72 (10): 1290–1293, arXiv:cond-mat/9907500, Bibcode:2004AmJPh..72.1290L, doi:10.1119/1.1773578, S2CID 14963488.
- Clauset, Aaron; Newman, M. E. J.; Moore, Cristopher (2004), "Finding community structure in very large networks" (PDF), Physical Review E, 70 (6) 066111, arXiv:cond-mat/0408187, Bibcode:2004PhRvE..70f6111C, doi:10.1103/PhysRevE.70.066111, PMID 15697438, S2CID 8977721.
- Achlioptas, Dimitris; Clauset, Aaron; Kempe, David; Moore, Cristopher (2005), "On the bias of traceroute sampling: or, power-law degree distributions in regular graphs", Proceedings of the 37th ACM Symposium on Theory of Computing (STOC '05), pp. 694–703, arXiv:cond-mat/0503087, doi:10.1145/1060590.1060693, S2CID 785270.
- Moore, Cristopher; Russell, Alexander; Sniady, Piotr (2007), "On the impossibility of a quantum sieve algorithm for graph isomorphism", Proceedings of the 39th ACM Symposium on Theory of Computing (STOC '07), pp. 536–545, arXiv:quant-ph/0612089, doi:10.1145/1250790.1250868, ISBN 978-1-59593-631-8, S2CID 8416060.
- Clauset, Aaron; Moore, Cristopher; Newman, M. E. J. (2008), "Hierarchical structure and the prediction of missing links in networks" (PDF), Nature, 453 (7191): 98–101, arXiv:0811.0484, Bibcode:2008Natur.453...98C, doi:10.1038/nature06830, hdl:2027.42/62623, PMID 18451861, S2CID 278058.
- Dinh, Hang; Moore, Cristopher; Russell, Alexander (2011), "McEliece and Niederreiter cryptosystems that resist quantum Fourier sampling attacks", Advances in Cryptology – Crypto 2011, Lecture Notes in Computer Science, vol. 6841, Springer, pp. 761–779, doi:10.1007/978-3-642-22792-9_43, ISBN 978-3-642-22791-2.
- Moore, Cristopher; Mertens, Stephan (2011), The Nature of Computation, Oxford: Oxford University Press, ISBN 978-0-19-923321-2, MR 2849868.
