= Assortative mixing =

Mixing with similar individuals

In the study of complex networks, assortative mixing, or assortativity, is a bias in favor of connections between network nodes with similar characteristics. In the specific case of social networks, assortative mixing is also known as homophily. The rarer disassortative mixing is a bias in favor of connections between dissimilar nodes.

In social networks, for example, individuals commonly choose to associate with others of similar age, nationality, location, race, income, educational level, religion, or language as themselves. In networks of sexual contact, the same biases are observed, but mixing is also disassortative by gender – most partnerships are between individuals of opposite sex.

Assortative mixing can have effects, for example, on the spread of disease: if individuals have contact primarily with other members of the same population groups, then diseases will spread primarily within those groups. Many diseases are indeed known to have differing prevalence in different population groups, although other social and behavioral factors affect disease prevalence as well, including variations in quality of health care and differing social norms.

Assortative mixing is also observed in other (non-social) types of networks, including biochemical networks in the cell, computer and information networks, and others.

Of particular interest is the phenomenon of assortative mixing by degree, meaning the tendency of nodes with high degree to connect to others with high degree, and similarly for low degree. Because degree is itself a topological property of networks, this type of assortative mixing gives rise to more complex structural effects than other types. Empirically it has been observed that most social networks mix assortatively by degree, but most networks of other types mix disassortatively, although there are exceptions.

== See also ==
- Assortative mating
- Assortativity
- Complex network
- Friendship paradox
- Graph theory
- Heterophily
- Homophily
- Preferential attachment
