= Rich-club coefficient =

Metric on networks

The rich-club coefficient is a metric on graphs and networks, designed to measure the extent to which well-connected nodes also connect to each other. Networks which have a relatively high rich-club coefficient are said to demonstrate the rich-club effect and will have many connections between nodes of high degree. The rich-club coefficient was first introduced in 2004 in a paper studying Internet topology.

The "Rich-club" effect has been measured and noted on scientific collaboration networks and air transportation networks. It has been shown to be significantly lacking on protein interaction networks.

== Definition ==
=== Non-normalized form ===
The rich-club coefficient was first introduced as an unscaled metric parametrized by node degree ranks. More recently, this has been updated to be parameterized in terms of node degrees k, indicating a degree cut-off. The rich-club coefficient for a given network N is then defined as:

$\phi(k) = \frac{2E_{>k}}{N_{>k}(N_{>k} - 1)}$	1

where $E_{>k}$ is the number of edges between the nodes of degree greater than or equal to k, and $N_{>k}$ is the number of nodes with degree greater than or equal to k. This measures how many edges are present between nodes of degree at least k, normalized by how many edges there could be between these nodes in a complete graph. When this value is close to 1 for values of k close to $k_{max}$, it is interpreted that high degree nodes of the network are well connected. The associated subgraph of nodes with degree at least k is also called the "Rich Club" graph.

=== Normalized for topology randomization ===
A criticism of the above metric is that it does not necessarily imply the existence of the rich-club effect, as it is monotonically increasing even for random networks. In certain degree distributions, it is not possible to avoid connecting high degree hubs. To account for this, it is necessary to compare the above metric to the same metric on a degree distribution preserving randomized version of the network. This updated metric is defined as:

$\rho_{rand}(k) = \frac{\phi(k)}{\phi_{rand}(k)}$	2

where $\phi_{rand}(k)$ is the rich-club metric on a maximally randomized network with the same degree distribution $P(k)$ of the network under study. This new ratio discounts unavoidable structural correlations that are a result of the degree distribution, giving a better indicator of the significance of the rich-club effect.

For this metric, if for certain values of k we have $\rho_{rand}(k) > 1$, this denotes the presence of the rich-club effect.

== Generalizations ==
=== General richness properties ===
The natural definition of a node's "richness" is its number of neighbours. If instead we replace this with a generic richness metric on nodes r, then we can rewrite the unscaled Rich-Club coefficient as:

$\phi(r) = \frac{2E_{> r}}{N_{>r}(N_{>r} - 1)}$	3

Where we are instead considering the sub graph on only nodes with a richness measure of at least r. For example, on scientific collaboration networks, replacing the degree richness (number of coauthors) with a strength richness (number of published papers), the topology of the rich club graph changes dramatically.

== Related metrics ==
=== Assortativity ===
The Assortativity of a network is a measurement of how connected similar nodes are, where similarity is typically viewed in terms of node degree. Rich-club can be viewed as a more specific notation of assortativity, where we are only concerned with the connectivity of nodes beyond a certain richness metric. For example, if a network consisted of a collection of hub and spokes, where the hubs were well connected, such a network would be considered disassortative. However, due to the strong connectedness of the hubs in the network, the network would demonstrate the rich-club effect.

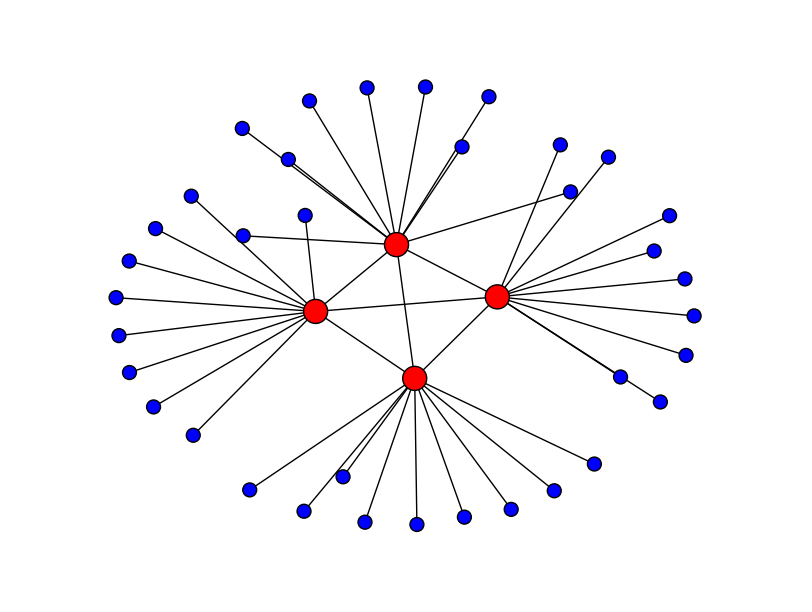
An example of a network which is both disassortative and demonstrates the Rich Club effect. The red nodes are hubs and form the "Rich Club."

== Applications ==
The rich-club coefficient of a network is useful as a heuristic measurement of the robustness of a network. A high rich-club coefficient implies that the hubs are well connected, and global connectivity is resilient to any one hub being removed. It is also useful for verifying theories that generalize to other networks. For example, the consistent observation of high rich-club coefficients for scientific collaboration networks adds evidence to the theory that within social groups, the elite tend to associate with one another.

== Implementations ==
The rich-club coefficient has been implemented in NetworkX, a Python library for network analysis. This implementation includes both the non-normalized and normalized forms as described above.

== See also ==
- Assortativity
- Preferential attachment
- Structural cut-off
