= Sexual network =

Social structure defined by sexual interactions between its members

A sexual network is a social network that is defined by the sexual relationships within a set of individuals.

== Studies and discoveries ==
Like other forms of social networks, sexual networks can be formally studied using the mathematics of graph theory and network theory.

Recent epidemiological studies have investigated sexual networks, and suggest that the statistical properties of sexual networks are crucial to the spread of sexually transmitted infections (STIs). Sub-graphs, both large and small, can be defined within the overall sexual network graph; for example, people who frequent particular bars or clubs, belong to a particular ethnic group or take part in a particular type of sexual activity, or are part of a particular outbreak of an STI. In particular, assortative mixing between people with large numbers of sexual partners seems to be an important factor in the spread of an STI.

In a surprising result, mathematical models predict that the sexual network graph for the human race appears to have a single giant component that indirectly links almost all people who have had more than one sexual partner, and a great many of those who have had only one sexual partner (if their one sexual partner was themselves part of the giant component).

For more detailed epidemiological work, the time sequence of sexual contacts is important.

== See also ==
- Bugchasing
- Contact tracing
- Small world experiment
- Social network
