= Park Seongwon (writer) =

Park Seongwon is a South Korean writer of the ‘Moonji’ school. Park Seongwon began his literary career by publishing a short story “Yuseo” (유서 The Will) in Literature and Society in 1994.

Park Seongwon’s fiction takes from Western pop music, particularly from 1960s~70s rock music.

== Life ==
Park Seongwon was born in 1969 in Daegu as the youngest child among 2 boys and 2 girls. He graduated from Yeungnam University in public administration, and he later graduated from Dongguk University’s graduate school in creative writing. He began his literary career in 1994 when he published his short story “Yuseo” (유서 The Will) in Literature and Society. He has served as a creative writing professor at Dongguk University, and he is currently a creative writing professor at Keimyung University.

== Writing ==
Literary critic Seong Min-yeop, who wrote the commentary for his second collection, Nareul Humchyeora (나를 훔쳐라 Steal Myself), has said that “ if Park Seongwon’s first collection Isang isang isang (이상 이상 이상 Roger Roger Roger) was struggling to figure out how to recognize and realize what is real within a postmodernist context, where the distinction between the fake and the real is blurry, his second collection Nareul Humchyeora (나를 훔쳐라 Steal Myself) is more about how there is already a general reality of established false truth, which the author attempts to deconstruct and overthrow that given reality.” After 2000, Park Seongwon chose the form of serialization, depicting the world in which people today live their lives in multilateral methods. Park Seongwon’s serial works – “Urineun dallyeoganda isanghan nararo” (우리는 달려간다 이상한 나라로 We Are Running to a Strange Country), “Dosineun mueoteuro irueojineunga” (도시는 무엇으로 이루어지는가 What is a City Made Of?), “Kempingkareul tago ullanbatoreukkaji” (캠핑카를 타고 울란바토르까지 To Ulaanbaatar in a Camping Car) – use peripheral characters from one short story as protagonists of another story, continuing the narrative in such ways, and they focus on the multidimensional truth of the world that is viewed from each method and situation.

== Works ==
- Gobaek (고백 Confession), Hyundae Munhak, 2015.
- Haru (하루 One Day), Moonji Publishing, 2012.
- Dosineun mueoteuro irueojineunga (도시는 무엇으로 이루어지는가 What is a City Made Of?), Munhakdongne, 2009.
- Urineun dallyeoganda (우리는 달려간다 We Are Running), Moonji Publishing, 2005.
- Nareul Humchyeora (나를 훔쳐라 Steal Myself), Moonji Publishing, 2000.
- Isang isang isang (이상 이상 이상 Roger Roger Roger), Moonji Publishing, 1996.

=== Works in Translation ===
- 都市は何によってできているのか (Japanese)

== Awards ==
- 2014 19th HMS (Hahn Moo-Sook) Literary Prize
- 2013 26th Dongguk Literary Award
- 2012 17th Hyundae Buddhist Literature Prize
- 2010 55th Hyundae Literary Award
- 2003 11th Today's Young Artist Award
