= Heterophily =

Heterophily (meaning "love of the different") is the tendency of individuals to collect in diverse groups; it is the opposite of homophily. This phenomenon can be seen in relationships between individuals. As a result, it can be analyzed in the workplace to create a more efficient and innovative workplace. It has also become an area of social network analysis.

== Origin and definition of the term ==
Most of the early work in heterophily was done in the 1960s by Everett Rogers in his book Diffusion Of Innovations. According to Rogers, "Heterophily, the mirror opposite of homophily, is defined as the degree to which pairs of individuals who interact are different in certain attributes". This is in contrast to homophily, the likelihood that individuals are to surround themselves with those they share similarities with. An example of heterophily would be to individuals from different ethnic and socio-economic backgrounds becoming friends. Through his work Rogers showed that heterophilous networks were better able to spread innovations. Later, scholars such as Paul Burton have drawn connections between modern social network analysis as practiced by Mark Granovetter in his theory of weak ties and the work of Georg Simmel. Burton found that Simmel's notion of "the stranger" is equivalent to Granovetter's weak tie in that both can bridge homophilous networks, turning them into one larger heterophilous network.

== In social and intimate relationships ==
Heterophily is usually not a term found often by itself. Rather it is often used in conjunction with other similar terms that define attraction. Heterophily is often discussed with its opposite, homophily when analyzing how relationships form between people. Heterophily also may be mentioned in areas such as homogamy, exogamy, and endogamy.

To fully understand heterophily, it is important to understand the meaning and importance of homophily. The theory of homophily states that "similarity breeds connection." Homophily has two specific types, status homophily and value homophily. Status homophily are ascribed statuses such as race, gender, and age. Value homophily refers to shared beliefs and practices between individuals. Studies of homophily have linked attraction between individuals based on similarly shared demographics. These may include, but are not limited to: race, ethnicity, gender, and socio-economic status. In fact, according to The logic of social bias: The structural demography of heterophily by Ray Reagans, the first component is the intrinsic level of interpersonal attraction due to homophily. Individuals are more likely to form social groups based upon what they have on common. This creates strong ties within the group. Mark Granovetter defined the strength of a tie as a "combination of the amount of time, the emotional intensity, the intimacy, and the reciprocal services which characterize the tie". However, Granovetter's article suggested that weak ties are also instrumental in building social networks. He believed that weak ties could be possibly more effective than strong ties in reaching individuals. Findings like this have been referenced when discussing heterophily.

The effect and occurrence of heterophily is also analyzed in intimate relationships. In Dangerous Liaisons? Dating and Drinking Diffusion in Adolescent Peer Networks, Derek Kreager and Dana Haynie mention the effects of heterophily on romantic relationships. They see the removal of the barrier of gender as a departure from the homophily of peer friendships. According to Kreager and Haynie "exposure to new behaviors and social contexts associated with a dating partner may also correspond to higher levels of influence from that partner." The terms homogamy, endogamy, and exogamy are often used when discussing intimate relationships in a sociological context. Homogamy refers to the tendency of individuals to marry others that share similarities with each other, while endogamy is the practice of marrying within a specific group. The relation between these terms and homophily is the tendency to be attracted to what is similar. Homogamy and endogamy may be a result of cultural practices or personal preference. Endogamy's antithesis, exogamy, is marriage only outside of a particular group.

== In the working environment ==
The concept of heterophily has been mentioned pertaining to working environments and the relationships within them. Heterophily is especially prevalent when discussing the diffusion of innovations theory. Diffusion of Innovations was the book written by Everett Rogers where he first termed heterophily. The diffusion of innovation theory itself is used to explain how new or innovative ideas are spread throughout a system composed of individuals. Rogers saw heterophily between individuals as "one of the most distinctive problems in the communication". This is because he believed homophily to be a more beneficial agent in communication. The general reasoning for this was that people who have more in common with each other are able to communicate more comfortably with each other. Still, Rogers believed that heterophily has such an impact on the diffusion of innovation theory that he stated in his book that "the very nature of diffusion demands that at least some degree of heterophily be present between the two participants". Heterophily is also an active part of the diffusion of information process. As a result, the concept of heterophily has been studied to try to improve relationships between individuals in the workplace.

== Heterophilic graph learning ==
In graph representation learning, heterophily means that nodes from different classes are more likely to be connected. People used to believe that heterophily would have negative effect for graph neural networks, because the features of inter-class nodes will be falsely mixed and become indistinguishable after neural message passing (feature aggregation). However, recent studies have found that only certain situations of heterophily are harmful, especially the mid-level homophily, i.e. mid-homophily pitfall. The heterophilic datasets are categorized into benign, malignant and ambiguous heterophily, where malignant and ambiguous heterophilic datasets are considered to be the real challenging ones.

There are lots of ways to address heterophily for graph representation learning, and using high-pass filter is the most popular and effective method, which is comprehensively verified. Heterophily is closely related to many real-world applications, e.g. fraud/anomaly detection, graph clustering, recommender systems, generative models, link prediction, graph classification and coloring. The studies of heterophily is well developed for homogeneous graphs, where there only exist one type of nodes and edges. However, the theory and methods for heterophily on heterogeneous graphs, temporal graphs and hypergraphs are still under-explored.

== See also ==
- Diffusion of innovations § Heterophily and communication channels
- Endogamy
- Exogamy
- Homophily
