= Personal network =

Set of human contacts known to an individual

A personal network is a set of human contacts known to an individual, with whom that individual would expect to interact at intervals to support a given set of activities. In other words, a personal network is a group of caring, dedicated people who are committed to maintain a relationship with a person in order to support a given set of activities. Having a strong personal network requires being connected to a network of resources for mutual development and growth.

Personal networks can be understood by:

- who knows you
- what you know about them
- what they know about you
- what are you learning together
- how you work at that

Personal networks are intended to be mutually beneficial, extending the concept of teamwork beyond the immediate peer group. The term is usually encountered in the workplace, though it could apply equally to other pursuits outside work.

Personal networking is the practice of developing and maintaining a personal network, which is usually undertaken over an extended period. The concept is related to business networking and is often encouraged by large organizations, in the hope of improving productivity, and so a number of tools exist to support the maintenance of networks. Many of these tools are IT-based, and use Web 2.0 technologies.

== History of networking and business success ==
In the second half of the twentieth century, U.S. advocates for workplace equity popularized the term and concept of networking as part of a larger social capital lexicon—which also includes terms such as glass ceiling, role model, mentoring, and gatekeeper—serving to identify and address the problems barring non-dominant groups from professional success. Mainstream business literature subsequently adopted the terms and concepts, promoting them as pathways to success for all career climbers. In 1970 these terms were not in the general American vocabulary; by the mid-1990s they had become part of everyday speech.

Before the mid-twentieth century, what is now called networking was framed in the language of family and friendship. These personal relationships provided a range of opportunities to preferred subsets of people, such as access to job opportunities, information, credit, and partnerships. Family networks and nepotism have been strong throughout history. Other common bonds—from ethnicity and religion to school ties and club memberships—can connect subsets of people as well. People whom insiders consider undesirable have been barred from such networks, with important consequences. Those who tap into influential networks can be nurtured toward success. Those who are shut out from networks can lose hope of success. Business figures of the past—such as Benjamin Franklin, Andrew Carnegie, Henry Ford, and John D. Rockefeller—exploited networks.

The business networks that seemed natural and transparent to these white men were a closed book to women and minorities for much of American history. Drawing on work from the social sciences, these outsider groups had to identify and then harness the mechanisms behind networking's power. A prominent early example of this process was the formation of corporate caucuses by black men at Xerox starting in 1969. Groups of black salesmen met regularly to share information about Xerox's culture and strategies for navigating it most effectively. Through confrontation and collaboration with a relatively accommodating upper management, the caucuses helped open opportunities for high-performing black employees.

The popular and business press began using the terms "network" and "networking" in the mid-1970s in the context of businesswomen consciously pursuing this strategy. Authors encouraged female workers to recognize and exploit the informal workplace systems that provided advancement. They urged women to identify mentors, use social contacts, and build peer and authority networks. The push for networking drew on ideas and relationships from the era's feminist movement, and dictionaries of the time explicitly linked business networking to women's efforts to succeed in the workplace.

Since the closing decades of the twentieth century, networking has become a pervasive term and concept in American society. People now invoke networking in relation to everything from business to child rearing to science. While ambitious careerists seek networks as an indispensable talisman, companies purposefully encourage networking among their employees to boost performance and gain competitive advantage. At the same time, Americans are forgetting the workplace activism that first illuminated the power of networking. Unfortunately, this loss of historical context can fuel a backlash against outsider groups who still seek to synthesize networks so they can access the same opportunities enjoyed by insiders.

== Characteristics of networks ==
Broadly speaking, all networks have the following characteristics:

- Purpose – A network can be established for learning, mission, business, idea, and family or personal reasons.
- Structure – A network is a group of interlinked entities that form a cluster. Most social structures tend to be characterized by dense clusters of strong connections.
- Style – The place, space, pace and style of interaction of the networks give an understanding of the style of the networks.

Namkee Park, Seungyoon Lee and Jang Hyun Kim examined the relations between personal network characteristics and Facebook use. According to their study, personal networks are investigated through several structural characteristics, which can be categorized into three major dimensions according to the level of analysis:

1. Dyadic tie attributes which include the characteristics of ego-alter ties such as duration, multiplexity, and proximity. Ego-alter tie attributes represent various dimensions of relationships between the focal person and their close contacts. First, tie duration refers to the length of time since the tie was originally initiated, which indicates the duration of relationships. Second, multiplexity includes a focal individual's degree of involvement in various types of interactions with network members. The third dimension is the physical proximity between ego and alter. Theories of proximity suggest that physical proximity between people affects their interaction and subsequently, their formation of network ties.
2. The characteristics of alter-alter ties including personal network density. When moving to ties at the alter-alter level, ego-network density, which refers to the extent to which one's alters are connected with each other, is an important dimension of personal networks. Dense personal network structure indicates close interpersonal contacts among alters, and consequently, is considered to promote the sharing of resources. On the other hand, loose connections, or structural holes in ego-networks, have been found to facilitate the flow of information and to provide advantages in searching and obtaining resources (e.g., getting a job).
3. The composition of alter attributes centered on the heterogeneity of alters in one's personal network. The heterogeneity of alters in one's personal network is associated with access to diverse resources and information It is expected, thus, that the heterogeneity attributes may enhance the focal actor's social activities.

Each of these characteristics represents unique aspects of individuals' network relationships.

== Types ==
Personal networks can be used for two main reasons: social and professional. In 2012, LinkedIn along with TNS conducted a survey of 6,000 social network users to understand the difference between personal social networks and personal professional networks. The "Mindset Divide" of users of these networks was compared as follows:

1. Emotions:
  1. Personal social networks: Nostalgia, fun, distraction.
  2. Personal professional networks: Achievement, success, aspiration.
2. Use:
  1. Personal social networks: Users are in a casual mindset often just passing time. They use social networks to socialize, stay in touch, be entertained and kill time.
  2. Personal professional networks: In this purposeful mindset, users invest time to improve themselves and their future. These networks are used to maintain professional identity, make useful contacts, search for opportunities and stay in touch.
3. Content:
  1. Personal professional networks: These provide information about career, brand updates and current affairs.
4. Professional development:
  1. Personal development networks: These provide access to those who can provide information, knowledge, advice, support, expertise, guidance, and concrete resources to learn and work effectively—thus those who support the continuing professional development.

== Personal network management ==
Personal network management (PNM) is a crucial aspect of personal information management and can be understood as the practice of managing the links and connections for social and professional benefits. Some ways to do this would be:

- being authentic and consistent
- paying attention to status updates
- following wisely
- contributing
- seeking to be worth knowing
- appropriate tagging

== Tools for personal network management ==
Although it is easy to build a network, the real challenge is maintaining and leveraging the connections. Information fragmentation makes it this even more challenging. Information fragmentation refers to the difficulty encountered in ensuring co-operation and keeping track of different personal information assets (e.g. Facebook, Twitter etc.).

According to Dan Schawbel, there is a lot of value in a contact management system. It "allows you to keep organized and aware of which contacts you haven't spoken to in a while, and who works at companies that you either want to collaborate with, or work for". In many ways, a contact manager can incorporate new, innovative services to not only help users take a smarter approach to meeting new people but also transmit readily available information from social media profiles directly into that contact profile.
