= Cosma Shalizi =

American physicist and statistician

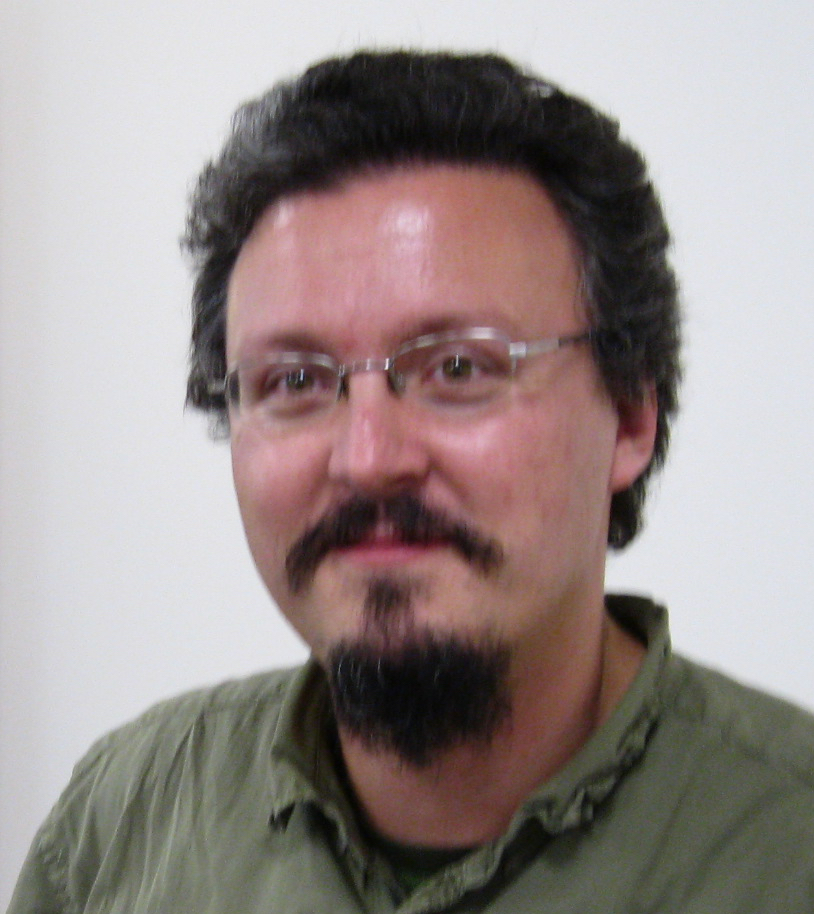
- Cosma Rohilla Shalizi
- Born: February 28, 1974 (age 52); Boston, United States
- Education: University of California, Berkeley; University of Wisconsin–Madison
- Known for: CSSR algorithm
- Scientific career
- Fields: Physics, Statistics
- Workplaces: Carnegie Mellon University; Santa Fe Institute; University of Michigan
- Doctoral advisor: James P. Crutchfield

Cosma Rohilla Shalizi (born February 28, 1974) is an associate professor in the Department of Statistics at Carnegie Mellon University in Pittsburgh.

== Life ==
Cosma Rohilla Shalizi is of Indian Tamil, Afghan (Rohilla) and Italian heritage and was born in Boston, where he lived for the first two years of his life. He grew up in Bethesda, Maryland.

In 1990, he was accepted as a Chancellor's Scholar at the University of California, Berkeley, and completed a bachelor's degree in Physics. Subsequently, he attended the University of Wisconsin–Madison where he received a doctorate in physics in May 2001. From 1998 to 2002, he worked at the Santa Fe Institute, in the Evolving Cellular Automata Project and the Computation, Dynamics and Inference group. From 2002 to 2005, he worked at the Center for the Study of Complex Systems at the University of Michigan in Ann Arbor. In August 2006, he became an assistant professor in the Department of Statistics at Carnegie Mellon University in Pittsburgh.

Shalizi is co-author of the CSSR algorithm, which exploits entropy properties to efficiently extract Markov models from time-series data without assuming a parametric form for the model.

Shalizi was interviewed at the Institute for New Economic Thinking in November 2011 on "Why Economics Needs Data Mining." He "urge[d] economists to stop doing what they are doing: Fitting large complex models to a small set of highly correlated time series data. Once you add enough variables, parameters, bells and whistles, your model can fit past data very well, and yet fail miserably in the future. Shalizi tells us how to separate the wheat from the chaff, how to compensate for overfitting and prevent models from memorizing noise. He introduces techniques from data mining and machine learning to economics — this is new economic thinking."

Shalizi gave an invited "Distinguished Lecture" at the University of California at Santa Barbara Data Science Initiative in May 2019. There he presented analysis of the statistical weaknesses of utilizing observational data to infer neighborhood effects in social networks. Id.

Shalizi's scholarly work has been cited more than 17,000 times, according to Google Scholar. He has an h-index of 40.

Shalizi writes a popular science blog "Three-Toed Sloth".
