= Social network analysis in criminology =

Analysis of social relationships in terms of network theory

Social network analysis in criminology views social relationships in terms of network theory, consisting of nodes (representing individual actors within the network) and ties (which represent relationships between the individuals, such as offender movement, sub offenders, crime groups, etc.). These networks are often depicted in a social network diagram, where nodes are represented as vertices and ties are represented as edges.

Known scholars of social network analysis include Gisela Bichler, Lucia Summers, Carlo Morselli, Aili Malm, Jean McGloin, Jerzy Sarnecki, Diane Haynie, Andrew Papachristos, Mangai Natarajan, Francesco Calderoni, and David Bright.

== Key terms ==
=== Offender Movement ===
The movement of deviants from one location to another (e.g. from home to the location of criminal acts).

=== Co-Offenders ===
When two or more distinct individuals who participate in a criminal act.

=== Crime Group ===
A social group, which participates in a criminal act. The group will often divide the labor in the act to maximize efficiency.

== Key concepts ==
=== Crime Pattern Theory ===
Crime pattern theory consists of four key points: (1) that criminal events are complex, (2) that crime is not random, (3) that criminal opportunities are not random, and (4) that offenders and victims are not pathological in their use of time and space.

=== Graph theory ===
Centrality measures are used to determine the relative importance of a vertex within the overall network (i.e. how influential a person is within a criminal network or, for locations, how important an area is to a criminal's behavior). There are four main centrality measures used in criminology network analysis:

==== Degree ====
Historically, the first and conceptually simplest is degree centrality, which is defined as the number of edges incident upon a vertex (i.e., the number of ties that a node has). The degree can be interpreted in terms of the immediate risk of a node for catching whatever is flowing through the network. In the case of a directed network (where ties have direction), it is usually defined as two separate measures of degree centrality, namely indegree and outdegree.

==== Betweenness ====
Betweenness centrality quantifies the number of times a vertex acts as a bridge along the shortest path between two other vertices. It was introduced as a measure for quantifying the control of a human on communication with other humans in a social network by Linton Freeman. In his conception, vertices that have a high probability to occur on a randomly chosen shortest path between two randomly chosen vertices have a high betweenness.

==== Eigenvector ====
Widely used in linear algebra, eigenvector centrality is a measure of the influence of a node in a network. It assigns relative scores to all vertices in the network based on the concept that connections to high-scoring vertices contribute more to the score of the vertex in question than equal connections to low-scoring vertices.

==== Closeness ====
The farness of a vertex is defined as the sum of its distances to all other vertices, and its closeness is defined as the inverse of the farness. Thus, the more central a vertex is, the lower its total distance to all other vertices. Closeness can be regarded as a measure of the speed at which information from one node spreads to all other nodes sequentially. In the classic definition of closeness centrality, the spread of information is modelled by the use of shortest paths. This model is considered to be one of the less accurate models for all types of communication scenarios.

== Co-offenders ==
A case study of an illegal drug importation network, monitored by law-enforcement over a period of two years, revealed "how legitimate world actors contribute to structuring a criminal network." It revealed "a minority of these actors were critical to the network in two ways: (1) they were active in bringing other participants (including traffickers) into the network; and (2) they were influential directors of relationships with both non-traffickers and traffickers."

Malm and Bichler have also analyzed an illicit drugs commodity chain by identifying where collaborating actors who are located within the chain that links the raw materials to the market absorption, to understand how illicit markets function. The created network captures the roles, functions, and structures of the groups involved in the illicit drug commodity chain and reveals the links in the supply chain (i.e. source, supply, sales, and feeders). The resiliency is determined by assessing the clusters in subgroups, identifying pivotal individuals holding central positions, and quantifying the potential to disrupt commodity and information flow by identifying the specific nodes to be removed for maximum effect.

The application of social network analysis during the collaboration between criminals and terrorists when both use smuggling tunnels was explored by Lichtenwald and Perri. Lichtenwald and Perri referenced many of the notable scholars and key papers in the field.

== Offender movement ==
Explaining the linkage between urban planning and crime patterns, Brantingham argues that four factors – accessibility through high-volume transportation conduits, placement, juxtaposition, and the operation of facilities – can account for the criminogenic capacity of specific places.

An individual's spatial awareness emerges from the routine travel to and from activity nodes (i.e. work, school, shopping, and recreation sites). This spatial awareness influences their behavior; offenders operate within their familiar settings, which are learned as the delinquent travels between activity nodes along constant paths. "Recent efforts to enhance journey-to-crime research: examine intraurban criminal migration using travel demand models; explore spatial-temporal constraints posed by routine activities; investigate how co-offending dynamics impact target selection; describe the journey away from crime sites; scrutinize subgroup variation; and assess the utility of distance decay models".

== See also ==
- Social network analysis software

== Selected bibliography ==
- Jean Marie McGloin & David S. Kirk (2011). "An overview of social network analysis". Journal of Criminal Justice Education. 21 (2): 169–181. doi:10.1080/10511251003693694. S2CID 144459720.
- Natarajan M (2006). "Understanding the Structure of a Large heroin Distribution Network: A Quantitative Analysis of Qualitative Data". J Quant Criminol. 22 (2): 171–192. doi:10.1007/s10940-006-9007-x. S2CID 144537747.
- McGloin J. M. (2005). "Policy and Intervention Consideration of a Network Analysis of Street Gangs". Criminology & Public Policy. 4 (3): 607–636. doi:10.1111/j.1745-9133.2005.00306.x.
