= International Network for Social Network Analysis =

Professional academic association

The International Network for Social Network Analysis (INSNA) is a professional academic association of researchers and practitioners of social network analysis.

== History ==
INSNA was founded in 1977 by Barry Wellman, a sociologist. A key function of the organization was to provide a sense of identity for a set of researchers who were widely dispersed geographically and across scientific disciplines.

Shortly after INSNA was founded, Linton C. Freeman founded the association's flagship journal, Social Networks, in 1978.

Early meetings were invitation-only, but in 1980 H. Russell Bernard and Alvin Wolfe inaugurated the series of annual "Sunbelt" meetings open to all.

A full chronology of INSNA leadership is as follows:

| Years | Leader |
|---|---|
| 1977–1988 | Barry Wellman |
| 1988–1993 | Al Wolfe |
| 1993–1999 | Steve Borgatti |
| 2000–2005 | Martin Everett |
| 2005–2007 | Bill Richards |
| 2007–2010 | George Barnett |
| 2011–2017 | John Skvoretz |
| 2017–2019 | Steve Borgatti |
| 2020–Present | Laura M. Koehly |

As of 2018, INSNA has approximately 1,000 active members, while the SOCNET listserv has about 3700 subscribers.

As well as publishing a triannual journal Connections on the subject, INSNA also:

- Runs SOCNET, a listserv mailing-list for the subject.
- Hosts the International Sunbelt Social Network Conference annually.
- Facilitates regional and specialized conferences.
- Publishes a quarterly journal, Social Networks.
- Publishes the online Journal of Social Structure, irregular periodicity.
- Provides links to researchers around the world.
- Provides raw data.

== See also ==
- Social network
- Social network analysis software
- Dynamic Network Analysis
