= Katz Index =

Katz index may refer to:

- Katz centrality in graph theory
- Katz Index of Independence in activities of daily living
