= Field Methods =

- Discipline: Research Methods
- Language: English
- Edited by: H. Russell Bernard

Publication details
- History: 1989–present
- Publisher: SAGE Publications (United Kingdom)
- Frequency: Quarterly
- Impact factor: 1.471 (2017)

Standard abbreviations
- ISO 4: Field Methods

Indexing
- ISSN: 1525-822X (print); 1552-3969 (web)
- LCCN: sn99008858
- OCLC no.: 41850329

Links
- Journal homepage; Online access; Online archive

Field Methods (formerly Cultural Anthropology Methods) is a peer-reviewed academic journal that publishes papers in the field of Social Sciences. The journal's editor is H. Russell Bernard (University of Florida). It has been in publication since 1989 and is currently published by SAGE Publications.

== History ==
The idea for a journal of methodology in the social sciences began in the 1980s, as a collaboration of H. Russell Bernard, Pertti J. Pelto, and Stephen Borgatti. Their early newsletter Cultural Anthropology Methods became in 1989 the Cultural Anthropology Methods Journal, often called the CAM journal.

In 1999, the CAM journal changed its name to Field Methods, with H. Russell Bernard continuing as its editor.

== Scope ==
Field Methods is a source of information for scholars, students and professionals alike. The journal publishes articles including descriptions of methodological advances, advice on the use of specific field techniques and help with both qualitative and quantitative methods. The journal also contains essays and book and software reviews.

== Abstracting and indexing ==
Field Methods is abstracted and indexed in, among other databases: SCOPUS, and the Social Sciences Citation Index. According to the Journal Citation Reports, its 2017 impact factor is 1.471, ranking it 33 out of 98 journals in the category ‘Social Sciences, Interdisciplinary’. and 32 out of 85 journals in the category ‘Anthropology’.
