= Social Networks (journal) =

- Discipline: Sociology, Social network theory
- Language: English
- Edited by: Ulrik Brandes, Tom Valente

Publication details
- History: 1979–present
- Publisher: Elsevier for the International Network for Social Network Analysis
- Frequency: Quarterly
- Impact factor: 3.1 (2022)

Standard abbreviations
- ISO 4: Soc. Netw.

Indexing
- ISSN: 0378-8733
- LCCN: 82643204
- OCLC no.: 473324852

Links
- Journal homepage; Online access

Social Networks is a quarterly peer-reviewed academic journal covering research on social network theory. The editors-in-chief are Thomas Valente (University of Southern California) and Ulrik Brandes (ETH Zurich). It was established in 1979 and is currently published by Elsevier.

== Abstracting and indexing ==
Social Networks is abstracted and indexed in:

- Anthropological Index
- Anthropological Literature
- Current Contents/Social & Behavioral Sciences
- Scopus
- Social Sciences Citation Index
- Sociological Abstracts

According to the Journal Citation Reports, its 2011 impact factor was 2.931, ranking it 6th out of 137 journals in the category "Sociology".
