= Society for Anthropological Sciences =

The Society for Anthropological Sciences (SASci) is a scholarly association whose goal is to promote the development of empirical theory and methods in anthropology. It was created in 2004 as one of many "interest groups" in the American Anthropological Association (AAA). According to SASci's "History" the impetus was that "in 2004 a substantial group of more scientifically oriented panels that had been proposed for the annual meetings of the AAA was rejected for lack of an interested section."

The group took an active part in 2010 controversies within the AAAS concerning the role of sciences in anthropology.

SASci's activities include an annual Carol R. Ember Book Prize, the bi-annual H. Russell Bernard Graduate Student Paper Prize ($500), and biannual awards for the two best student presentations at the AAAS annual meeting and at the SASci spring meeting.
