= Alexandra Brewis Slade =

New Zealand-American anthropologist

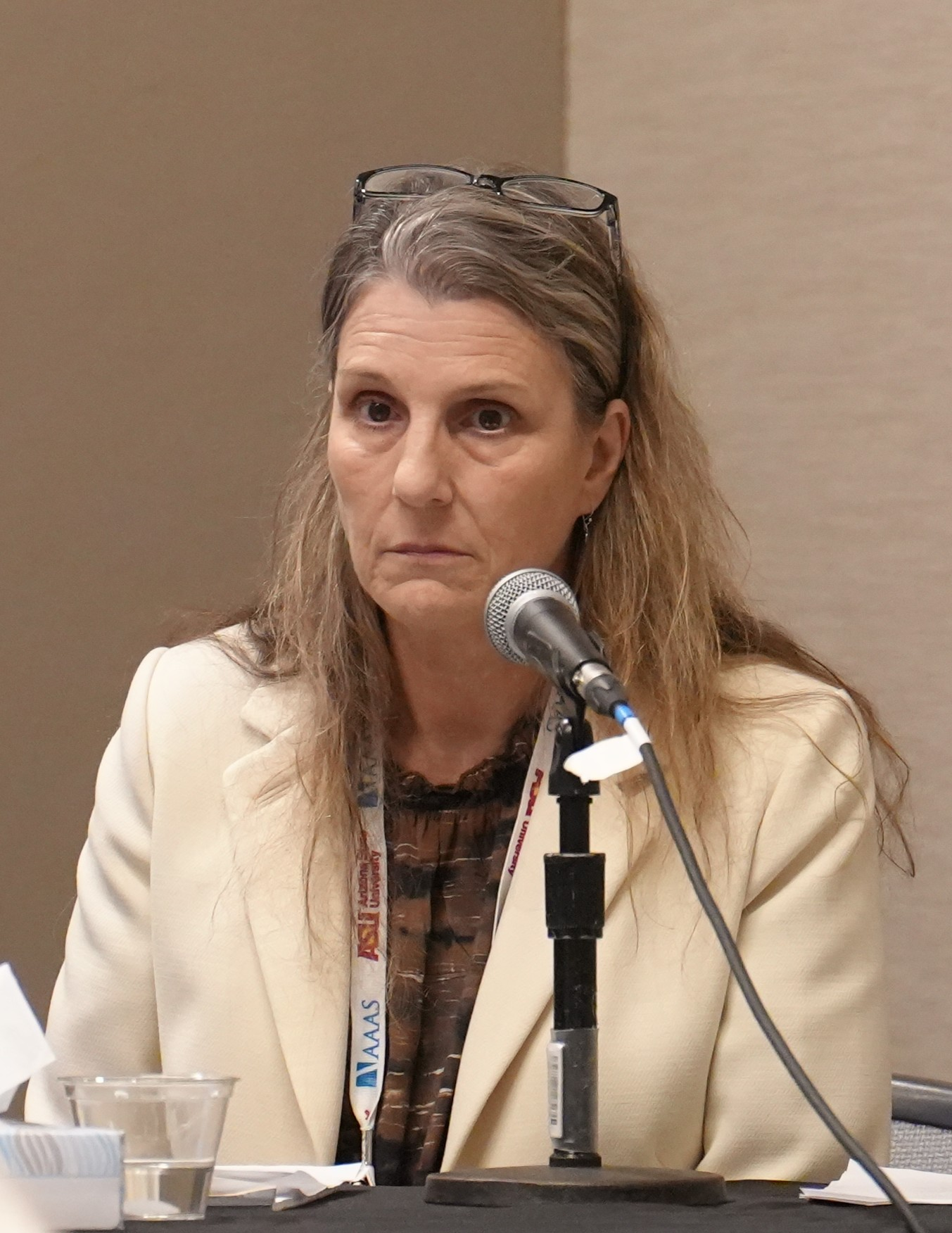
- Slade in 2026
- Born: Alexandra Brewis; Auckland, New Zealand
- Education: PhD (University of Arizona), MA, BA (University of Auckland)
- Occupations: anthropologist, academic, author
- Employer: Arizona State University
- Known for: Director, School of Human Evolution and Social Change, Arizona State University; President, Human Biology Association; Author, The Human Story; Senior Editor Social Science & Medicine
- Awards: Elected fellow American Association for the Advancement of Science (AAAS); Conrad Arensberg Award 2023; Franz Boas Award 2024.
- Website: https://alexbrewis.org

Alexandra Brewis Slade (born 1965) is a New Zealand-American anthropologist, professor, and author who has advanced new theories to understand the biocultural consequences (such as for body weight and mental health) of moralized classification systems. She is an advocate for a reduction of stigma in global health practices. She writes under the name Alexandra Brewis.

== Career ==
Brewis Slade is a Regent's Professor and President's Professor at Arizona State University and an elected fellow of the American Association for the Advancement of Science. She founded ASU's Center for Global Health, and designed and launched (in 2008) the first and largest undergraduate global health degree in the United States. She was Director of ASU's School of Human Evolution and Social Change from 2009-2017. In 2017 the School of Human Evolution and Social Change was ranked #1 in anthropology in the US for research scale and #1 in the US (#4 in the world) for research impact. She also served as an Associate Vice President for Social Sciences as ASU moved from #15 to #4 ranking nationally in social science research expenditures. Brewis Slade has served as president of the Human Biology Association.

== Honors and awards ==
- Conrad Arensberg award by the American Anthropological Association for advancing anthropology as a science,
- Franz Boas Distinguished Achievement Award for exemplary contributions to human biology by the Human Biology Association.
- Carol R. Ember Book Prize
- Human Biology Association Book Award
- Elected fellow of the American Association for the Advancement of Science.

== Education ==
Brewis Slade's schooling was at St Cuthbert's College, Auckland and Selwyn College, Auckland. She earned her anthropology B.A at University of Auckland in 1985, her M.A. there in 1989, and her Ph.D from the University of Arizona in 1992. Her postdoctoral training in demography was at Brown University.

== Research ==
Brewis Slade has published 8 books and over 250 scholarly articles. Her research includes collaborations with communities and scholars in many different fields, and focuses on the health implications of how human culture and biology interact. Her field research was initially based in the small island nations of the Pacific region, but has expanded over the last three decades to include collaborative research projects in the Americas, Africa, and the Caribbean.

Topically, she has published extensively on the human dimensions of stigma and other stressful forms of arbitrary classification on fertility, weight, and water insecurity. In 2011, her research demonstrating the rapid globalization of negative views toward high body weights was covered on the Front page of The New York Times. Committed to the application of social science research for public good, she writes and lectures on how to improve the impacts of international development work through anthropological methods, and on strategies for recognizing and reducing stigma in global health practice. She blogs on human dimensions of global health at Psychology Today

Her recent research from locations including Haiti, Ethiopia, and Nepal has demonstrated why unfairness, social conflict, and other social implications of the meanings around water insecurity is a trigger for both mental illness and chronic disease, a theory she has advanced over the last decade. With Amber Wutich she co-founded the Global Ethnohydrology Study, a global effort to understand cultural variation around water and climate challenges.

== Selected books ==
- Brewis, A. et al. 2024. The Human Story: An Introduction to Anthropology. WW Norton, New York.
- Brewis, A. and A. Wutich. 2019. Lazy, Crazy, and Disgusting: Stigma and the Undoing of Global Health. Johns Hopkins University Press. Winner, Carol R Ember Book Prize; Winner, Human Biology Association Book Award; Finalist, Foundation for the Sociology of Health and Illness Book Prize.
- Brewis, A. 2011. Obesity: Cultural and Biocultural Perspectives. Rutgers University Press.
- Brewis, A. 1996. Lives on the Line: Women and Ecology on a Pacific Atoll. Harcourt Brace Jovanovich.
