= Edward Bruner =

American anthropologist

Edward M. Bruner
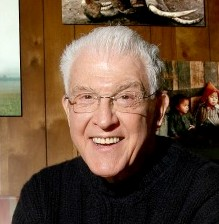
- Bruner at his home 2005
- Born: Edward M. Bruner; September 28, 1924; New York City, New York, U.S.
- Died: August 7, 2020 (aged 95); Urbana, Illinois, U.S.
- Spouse: (m. 1948)
- Children: 2

Academic background
- Education: Ohio State University (B.A. 1948); Ohio State University (M.A. 1950); University of Chicago (Ph.D. 1954)

Academic work
- Discipline: Anthropology
- Sub-discipline: Cultural Anthropology
- Institutions: University of Illinois Urbana-Champaign; Yale University; University of Chicago; Ohio State University

Edward M. Bruner (September 28, 1924 – August 7, 2020) was professor emeritus of anthropology and criticism and interpretive theory at the University of Illinois at Urbana-Champaign. He was an American anthropologist known for his contributions to the anthropology of tourism, particularly his constructivist, processual approach that centers on experience and narrative in and beyond tourist settings. His book Culture on Tour: Ethnographies of Travel is perhaps his best-known book. He has written numerous articles on tourism and has edited or coedited four volumes, including International Tourism: Identity and Change. His early field research was on acculturation and culture chance in Native North American communities in the 1950s. Subsequently, he studied Toba Batak migrants in Indonesia in the 1960s, then turned his attention to performance, narrative, and tourism in the 1980s through the present.

== Early life ==
Edward Bruner was born in September 1924 in New York City, and attended Stuyvesant High School. After World War II, he attended Ohio State University, where he met his wife. Intending to transfer to Columbia University, he took a summer course with anthropologist Alfred L. Kroeber and decided to change his major to anthropology. He obtained bachelor's and master's degrees at Ohio State University and earned a doctorate from the University of Chicago.

== Professional life ==
Bruner taught for most of his career in the Anthropology Department at the University of Illinois at Urbana–Champaign. In addition to his own prolific scholarship on migration, identity, performance, ritual, and tourism/ tourist productions, he trained many scholars who were to go on to make important contributions to anthropology, including Russell Bernard and Carol Stack. He has served as the president of both the Society for Humanistic Anthropology and the American Ethnological Society. His scholarship pushed for the recognition of tourism as an important lens for understanding how culture is generated and performed, and for gleaning insights into the role of narratives in meaning-making. His understanding of any tourist site as "contested," with multiple and often conflicting interpretations, stories and narratives, was important for the anthropological study of tourism, as was his concept of touristic borderzones. An award-winning 2019 book, The Ethnography of Tourism: Edward Bruner and Beyond edited by Naomi Leite, Quetzil Casteneda and Kathleen M. Adams traces his contributions to the anthropology of tourism and the influences of his concepts on subsequent generations in the field of tourism studies.

In 1947 Bruner attended a summer course on Anthropology by Alfred L. Kroeber at Columbia University. This course was transformative and led Bruner to drop engineering and become an anthropologist. After completing his undergrad and masters at Ohio State, he decided on the University of Chicago to pursue his Ph.D. In 1954 there was an opening for an assistant professor at Yale University. 65 anthropologists applied; Bruner got the job. As it turns out, the opening was due to the passing of Alfred Kroeber. After 6 years at Yale, Bruner accepted a position at the University of Illinois which was establishing a new department of anthropology. It started off with very distinguished anthropologists, Julian Steward, Oscar Lewis, and Joseph Casagrande. Bruner became head of the department from 1964 to 1968

== Personal life ==
Bruner was married and had two children. He died on August 7, 2020, at the age of 95.

== Significant publications ==
- Bruner, Edward M. 1955. “Two Processes of Change in Mandan-Hidatsa Kinship Terminology.” American Anthropologist 57 (4): 840–50.
- Bruner, Edward M. 1956a. “Cultural Transmission and Cultural Change.” Southwestern Journal of Anthropology 12 (2): 191–99.
- Bruner, Edward M. 1956b. “Primary Group Experience and the Process of Acculturation.” American Anthropologist 59 (4): 605–23.
- Bruner, Edward M. 1961. “Urbanization and Ethnic Identity in North Sumatra.” American Anthropologist 63 (3): 508–21.
- Bruner, Edward M. 1973. "The Missing Tins of Chicken: A Symbolic Interactionist Approach to Culture Change." Ethos 1 (2): 219–38.
- Bruner, Edward M., ed. 1984a. Text, Play and Story: The Construction and Reconstruction of Self and Society. Washington, DC: American Anthropological Association.
- Bruner, Edward M. 1986a. “Introduction: Experience and Its Expressions.” In The Anthropology of Experience, edited by Victor Turner and Edward M. Bruner, 3–30. Urbana: University of Illinois Press.
- Bruner, Edward M. 1986b. “Ethnography as Narrative.” In The Anthropology of Experience, edited by Victor Turner and Edward M. Bruner, 139–55. Urbana: University of Illinois Press.
- Bruner, Edward M. 1989b. "Of Cannibals, Tourists, and Ethnographers." Cultural Anthropology 4 (4): 438–45.
- Bruner, Edward M. 1991. “The Transformation of Self in Tourism.” Annals of Tourism Research 18 (2): 238–50.
- Bruner, Edward M. 1993b. “Lincoln's New Salem as a Contested Site.” Museum Anthropology 17 (3): 14–25.
- Bruner, Edward M. 1994. “Abraham Lincoln as Authentic Reproduction.” American Anthropologist 96 (2): 397–415.
- Bruner, Edward M. 1996a. “Tourism in the Balinese Borderzone.” In Displacement, Diaspora, and Geographies of Identity, edited by Smadar Lavie and Ted Swedenburg, 157–70. Durham, NC: Duke University Press.
- Bruner, Edward M. 1996b. “Tourism in Ghana: The Representation of Slavery and the Return of the Black Diaspora.” American Anthropologist 98 (2): 290–304.
- Bruner, Edward M. 1999. “Return to Sumatra: 1957, 1997.” American Ethnologist 26 (2): 461–77.
- Bruner, Edward, 2005a. Culture on Tour: Ethnographies of Travel. Chicago: University of Chicago Press.
- Bruner, Edward M. 2005d. “Through the Looking Glass: Reflections on an Anthropological Life.” Anthropology and Humanism 30 (2): 201–07.
- Bruner, Edward M. 2010b. "The Two Reviews: Science and Humanism in Tourism Studies." Annals of Tourism Research 37 (3): 861–65.
- Bruner, Edward M. 2012. “Around the World in Sixty Years: From Native America to Indonesia to Tourism and Beyond.” In The Restless Anthropologist: New Fieldsites, New Visions, edited by Alma Gottlieb, 138–58. Chicago: University of Chicago Press.
- Bruner, Edward M. 2014. “The Aging Anthropologist.” Anthropology and Humanism 39 (1): 27–31.
