= Amber Wutich =

American anthropologist and academic

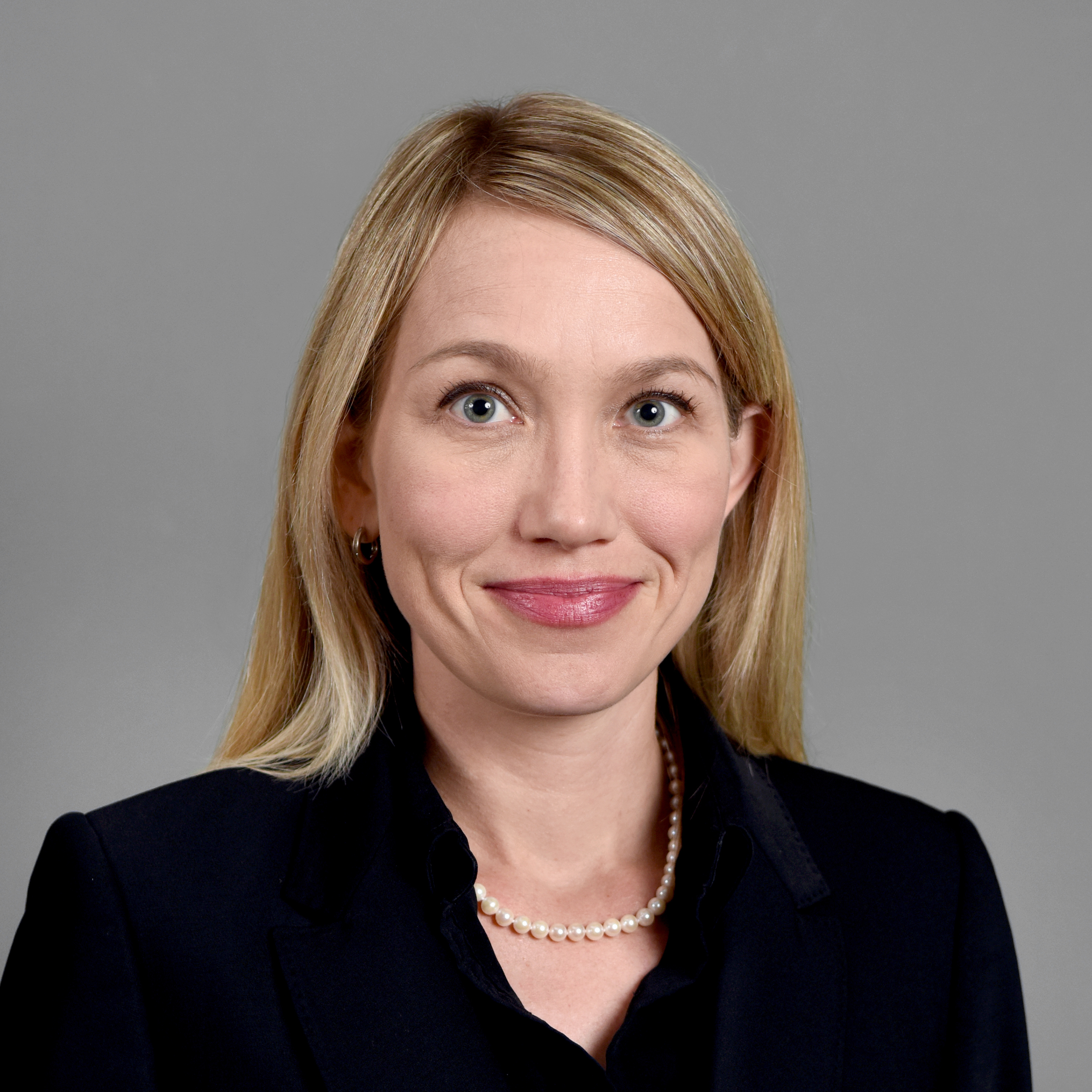
- Wutich in 2017
- Born: Miami, Florida
- Education: University of Florida
- Scientific career
- Workplaces: Arizona State University
- Thesis: The effects of urban water scarcity on sociability and reciprocity in Cochabamba, Bolivia (2006)

Amber Wutich is an American anthropologist who is Regents & President's Professor and the Director of the Center for Global Health at Arizona State. Her research considers the impact of water scarcity on human wellbeing. In 2023, she was elected a Fellow of the American Association for the Advancement of Science and named a MacArthur Fellow.

== Early life and education ==
Wutich was raised in Miramar, Florida. She has said that she was inspired to work on social justice and water scarcity following Hurricane Andrew. She was an undergraduate anthropology student at the University of Florida, and spent a year at Shaanxi University of Technology. She continued at the University of Florida for her graduate research under the direction of H. Russell Bernard. Her doctoral research considered the impact of water scarcity on sociability in Cochabamba, and involved a year as a Fulbright scholar in Bolivia. After earning her doctorate, Wutich joined Nancy Grimm at Arizona State University, where she spent one year as a postdoctoral researcher before joining the faculty.

== Research and career ==
Wutich's early work considered Cochabamba, where water shortages occurred because of migration from a nearby mining community. In 2000, the government tried to privatise its water resources, which drove up prices and resulted in protests. Inadequate planning and infrastructure resulted in a population with limited access to safe water. She developed a methodology to assess and document local water needs. She found that the people established their own social water infrastructure, with households self-organizing their own water access and interacting with water vendors. She also found that water insecurity caused considerable distress. Working with biocultural anthropologist Alexandra Brewis, she has demonstrated that scarcity is not the primary cause of distress but the meanings of water such as stigma associated with water negotiations, inequity in access and complicated sharing arrangements. Wutich is Director of the Action for Water Equity Consortium.

Wutich co-developed an interdisciplinary, international network focused on water insecurity that has been formalized as the Water InSecurity Experiences (WISE) Community of Practice. The WISE collaboration created standardized techniques to collect and analyze data, which involved developing meaningful assessment methods across culturally distinct regions. She calls her research "justice oriented". She founded the Global Ethnohydrology Study with Alexandra Brewis, which has collected local knowledge about water insecurity in over twenty countries.

== Awards and honors ==
- 2010 Elected Fellow of the Society for Applied Anthropology
- 2020 Faculty Women's Association Outstanding Faculty Mentor Award
- 2020 Carol R. Ember Book Prize
- 2022 Human Biology Association Book Award
- 2023 Elected Fellow of the American Association for the Advancement of Science
- 2023 MacArthur Fellows Program
- 2026 Elected to the National Academy of Sciences

== Selected publications ==
- Bernard, H. Russell; Wutich, Amber; Ryan, Gery W. (2017). Analyzing qualitative data: systematic approaches (2nd ed.). Los Angeles London New Delhi Singapore Washington DC Melbourne: SAGE. ISBN 978-1-4833-4438-6.
- Hagaman, Ashley K.; Wutich, Amber (2016-06-24). "How Many Interviews Are Enough to Identify Metathemes in Multisited and Cross-cultural Research? Another Perspective on Guest, Bunce, and Johnson's (2006) Landmark Study". Field Methods. 29 (1): 23–41. doi:10.1177/1525822X16640447. ISSN 1525-822X.
- Wutich, Amber; Ragsdale, Kathleen (2008-12-01). "Water insecurity and emotional distress: Coping with supply, access, and seasonal variability of water in a Bolivian squatter settlement". Social Science & Medicine. 67 (12): 2116–2125. doi:10.1016/j.socscimed.2008.09.042. ISSN 0277-9536. PMID 18954928.
