= H. Russell Bernard =

American anthropologist

- Born: June 12, 1940; New York City, U.S.
- Known for: Social network theory Cultural anthropology Language preservation

Academic background
- Education: Queens College (BA); University of Illinois (MA); University of Illinois (PhD)
- Thesis: Kalymnos: Economic and Cultural Change on a Greek Sponge Fishing Island (1968)
- Doctoral advisor: Edward Bruner

Academic work
- Discipline: Anthropology
- Institutions: University of Florida; Arizona State University
- Website: https://hrussellbernard.com

Harvey Russell Bernard (born 1940) is an American anthropologist and social scientist, known for his research on social network analysis, for his use of computers to preserve the cultural history of vanishing languages, and for his work on training young anthropologists. Bernard, who is director of ASU's Institute for Social Science Research, is also a professor emeritus of anthropology of the University of Florida.

== Education and teaching career ==
H. Russell Bernard, born in New York City on June 12, 1940, majored in anthropology and sociology at New York's Queens College, earning a BA in 1961.

He earned an MA in linguistic anthropology from University of Illinois in 1963, doing work that he later said shaped much of his career.

He then continued at the University of Illinois, doing graduate work in the area of quantitative data analysis with his thesis adviser Edward Bruner, getting his Ph.D. in 1968.

Bernard's anthropology career after leaving the University of Illinois included work at Washington State University and at West Virginia University. The University of Florida anthropology department recruited him as a full professor and department chair in 1979. In 2015, ASU hired Bernard to direct its Institute for Social Science Research.

== Social network analysis ==
Small world theory model

Bernard (together with oceanographer Peter Killworth whom he met in 1972 while both were working at the Scripps Institution of Oceanography) designed the "reverse small world" experiment (1978). This took an approach different from Stanley Milgram's "small-world" research, which had been done in the 1960's. Where Milgram had studied the network-distance between two random people (Six degrees of separation), Bernard and Killworth instead asked people to name a person whom they would first approach if they were starting to reach out to contact an unknown person.

Bernard and Killworth also developed the "network scale-up method" (NSUM), a new and inexpensive way to estimate the size of hard-to-count populations. Its original use was to estimate the number of people who had been killed by a recent earthquake. By asking each respondent a number of questions in the form "How many X's do you know?", they were able to use data from populations whose size they knew (doctors, people over 80, etc.) to scale-up from the number of earthquake victims known to each respondent to the probable number of earthquake victims in a population.

Their NSUM mathematical model has also been used to improve calculation of the size of a person's social network. The 1990's Dunbar's number theorem had estimated people's average social network size was about 150. The Bernard-Killworth number was about 290. A survey paper "Thirty Years of The Network Scale-up Method" published in 2021 in the Journal of the American Statistical Association reported that network scale-up methods still needed more improvement but, having "been used in a large number of real-world studies..have offered promising results in the field of size estimation."

== Language preservation ==
While studying tone-patterns of the Otomi language in 1962, Bernard started collaborating with Otomi-speaker Jesús Salinas Pedraza. In 1971, they began working on an ethnography that would be written by Pedraza in his native language and translated by Bernard. Using an Apple II computer with Gutenberg word-processing software, Bernard was able to create custom fonts with special characters matching the orthography of Otomi language. This collaboration produced four volumes written in Otomi with translations into English and Spanish.

Since the 1980s, Bernard has worked to preserve vanishing languages by helping native speakers use computers to create books in those languages. By using computers to create WYSIWYG text in scripts used for vanishing languages, Bernard's goal was to create camera-ready text and reduce the cost of creating books in those languages. According to Bernard, desktop publishing can play a vital role in helping indigenous-language authors share their work.

Writing in The Washington Post in 2008, Joel Garreau called Bernard "a grand old man of endangered-language research."

== Methodology work ==
Research is a craft. I’m not talking analogy here. Research isn’t like a craft. It is a craft. If you know what people have to go through to become skilled carpenters or makers of clothes, you have some idea of what it takes to learn the skills for doing research. It takes practice, practice, and more practice.

— H. Russell Bernard, Research Methods in Anthropology, page 1 (4th edition, 2006)

Bernard's work on practical aspects of anthropology has been influential, not least his widely-quoted mantra that "research is a craft."

In the 1980s, Bernard, together with Pertti J. Pelto and Stephen Borgatti, started the three-times-yearly Cultural Anthropology Methods Newsletter (sometimes called the CAM Newsletter), which in 1989 became the Cultural Anthropology Methods Journal. Bernard was its first editor, continuing in that role when in 1995 the journal changed its name to Field Methods.

Bernard has also served as editor of other scholarly journals. From 1976–1981, he edited Human Organization, the journal of the Society for Applied Anthropology. From 1981–1989, he was editor-in-chief of American Anthropologist, the flagship journal of the American Anthropological Association (AAA).

Bernard is the author of Research Methods in Cultural Anthropology (6th edition) which has been described as "the most revered book of cultural anthropological research methods" (E. N. Anderson) and "without doubt the best book in this field" (Daniel Bates). His other books on methodology include Social Research Methods: Qualitative and Quantitative Approaches and Analyzing Qualitative Data: Systematic Approaches (2nd edition, coauthored with Gery W. Ryan and Amber Wutich).

The "methods camp" summer training program in cultural anthropology was started, with NSF support, by Bernard and Pertti Pelto in 1987. The NSF-funded Cultural Anthropology Methods Program (CAMP) at ASU, which Bernard co-leads with his former student Amber Wutich, is a continuation of this program. In 2024, the Cultural Anthropology Methods Program started "CAMP-International," inviting anthropologists around the world to a virtual online version of the program, including a listserv and YouTube curriculum, where lectures in English are available with subtitles "in Spanish, French, Portuguese, Chinese, Japanese, Swahili, Bangla, and Guarani."

== Recognition ==
Bernard was elected a member of the National Academy of Sciences in 2010. He has received from The American Anthropological Association both their Franz Boas Award (2003) and their Conrad M. Arensberg Award (2024). The Society for Anthropological Sciences, which "promotes empirical research and social science in anthropology," has since 2016 awarded the "H. Russell Bernard Graduate Student Paper Prize" for a student paper presented at the annual meeting of the American Anthropological Association.
