= Leo Katz (statistician) =

American statistician (1914–1976)

Leo Katz (29 November 1914 in Detroit – 6 May 1976) was an American statistician. Katz largely contributed to the area of Social Network Analysis. In 1953, he introduced a centrality measure named Katz centrality that computes the degree of influence of an actor in a social network. The computation already outlined the algorithm today known as PageRank.

In 1956 he was elected as a Fellow of the American Statistical Association.
