= Dorothea Wagner =

German computer scientist

Dorothea Wagner (born 1957) is a German computer scientist, known for her research in graph drawing, route planning, and social network analysis. She heads the Institute of Theoretical Informatics at the Karlsruhe Institute of Technology.

== Biography ==
Wagner did her undergraduate studies at RWTH Aachen University, graduating in 1983, and then continued at RWTH Aachen for her graduate studies, earning a Ph.D. in 1986 under the supervision of Rolf Möhring and Walter Oberschelp. She then earned her habilitation at Technische Universität Berlin in 1992. She stayed at TU Berlin as an assistant professor, also taking a temporary position at the University of Halle-Wittenberg in 1993, before becoming a full professor at the University of Konstanz in 1994. In 2003, she moved to Karlsruhe.

Since 2007 she is vice president of the German Research Foundation (DFG). She is one of five editors-in-chief of the Journal of Discrete Algorithms, published by Elsevier, and editor-in-chief of the OpenAccess Series in Informatics book series published by Schloss Dagstuhl. She has been program committee chair or co-chair of the 10th Workshop on Algorithm Engineering and Experiments (ALENEX'2008), 14th International Symposium on Graph Drawing (GD'2006), 2nd Workshop on Algorithmic Methods and Models for Optimization of Railways (ATMOS'2002), 26th International Workshop on Graph-Theoretic Concepts in Computer Science (WG'2000), and 4th Workshop on Algorithm Engineering (WAE'2000), and been on the editorial boards and program committees of many more computer science journals and conferences.

In 2019 Wagner was one of three candidates for the position as president of the DFG; after a year-long selection process, the position eventually went to Katja Becker.

== Awards and honors ==
In 2008 she was elected as a fellow of the Gesellschaft für Informatik. In 2012 she received a Google Focused Research Award together with Hannah Bast and Peter Sanders for the project “Next-Generation Route Planning“. She is a member of the Academia Europaea. In 2019 she was awarded the Konrad Zuse Medal.

== Selected publications ==
- Schulz, Frank; Wagner, Dorothea; Weihe, Karsten (2000), "Dijkstra's algorithm on-line: An empirical case study from public railroad transport", ACM Journal of Experimental Algorithmics, 5: 12, doi:10.1145/351827.384254, S2CID 6600150.
- Kaufmann, Michael; Wagner, Dorothea, eds. (2001), Drawing Graphs: Methods and Models, Lecture Notes in Computer Science, vol. 2025, Springer, doi:10.1007/3-540-44969-8, ISBN 9783540420620, S2CID 1808286
- Wagner, Dorothea; Willhalm, Thomas (2003), "Geometric Speed-Up Techniques for Finding Shortest Paths in Large Sparse Graphs", in Di Battista, Giuseppe; Zwick, Uri (eds.), Algorithms - ESA 2003, Lecture Notes in Computer Science, vol. 2832, Springer, pp. 776–787, doi:10.1007/978-3-540-39658-1_69, ISBN 978-3-540-20064-2.
- Brandes, Ulrik; Wagner, Dorothea (2004), "visone - Analysis and Visualization of Social Networks", in Jünger, Michael; Mutzel, Petra (eds.), Graph Drawing Software, Springer, pp. 321–340.
- Brandes, U.; Delling, D.; Gaertler, M.; Gorke, R.; Hoefer, M.; Nikoloski, Z.; Wagner, D. (2008), "On Modularity Clustering" (PDF), IEEE Transactions on Knowledge and Data Engineering, 20 (2): 172–188, Bibcode:2008ITKDE..20..172B, doi:10.1109/TKDE.2007.190689, S2CID 150684.
