= Closeness centrality =

Inverse sum of distances in a graph

In a connected graph, closeness centrality (or closeness) of a node is a measure of centrality in a network, calculated as the reciprocal of the sum of the length of the shortest paths between the node and all other nodes in the graph. Thus, the more central a node is, the closer it is to all other nodes.

The number next to each node is the distance from that node to the square red node as measured by the length of the shortest path. The green edges illustrate one of the two shortest paths between the red square node and the red circle node. The closeness of the red square node is therefore 5/(1+1+1+2+2) = 5/7.

Closeness was defined by Bavelas (1950) as the reciprocal of the farness, that is:

$$C_B(x)= \frac{1}{\sum_y d(y,x)},$$

where $d(y,x)$ is the distance (length of the shortest path) between vertices $x$ and $y$. This unnormalised version of closeness is sometimes known as status. When speaking of closeness centrality, people usually refer to its normalized form which represents the average length of the shortest paths instead of their sum. It is generally given by the previous formula multiplied by $N-1$, where $N$ is the number of nodes in the graph resulting in:

$$C(x)= \frac{N-1}{\sum_y d(y,x)}.$$

The normalization of closeness simplifies the comparison of nodes in graphs of different sizes. For large graphs, the minus one in the normalisation becomes inconsequential and it is often dropped.

As one of the oldest centrality measures, closeness is often given in general discussions of network centrality measures in introductory texts or in articles comparing different centrality measures. The values produced by many centrality measures can be highly correlated. In particular, closeness and degree have been shown to be related in many networks through an approximate relationship

$$\frac{1}{C(x)} \approx \frac{-1}{\ln(z-1)} \ln(k_x) + \beta$$

where $k_x$ is the degree of vertex $x$ while $z$ and β are parameters found by fitting closeness and degree to this formula. The z parameter represents the branching factor, the average degree of nodes (excluding the root node and leaves) of the shortest-path trees used to approximate networks when demonstrating this relationship. This is never an exact relationship but it captures a trend seen in many real-world networks.

Closeness is related to other length scales used in network science. For instance, the average shortest path length $\langle \ell \rangle$, the average distance between vertices in a network, is simply the average of the inverse closeness values

$$\langle \ell \rangle = \frac{1}{N} \sum_x \frac{1}{C(x)} = \frac{1}{N(N-1)} \sum_x \sum_y d(y,x)$$.

Taking distances from or to all other nodes is irrelevant in undirected graphs, whereas it can produce totally different results in directed graphs (e.g. a website can have a high closeness centrality from outgoing links, but low closeness centrality from incoming links).

== Applications ==
Closeness is used in many different contexts. In bibliometrics closeness has been used to look at the way academics choose their journals and bibliographies in different fields or to measure the impact of an author on a field and their social capital. When used to select potential leads in customer data, closeness has been seen to lead to a significant gain in the success rate. The closeness of a city in an air transport network has been shown to be highly correlated with socio-economic indicators such as gross regional domestic product. Closeness has also been applied to biological networks where, for instance, this was used to identify more than 50% of the global regulators within the top 2% of the ranked genes or essential genes were found to have higher closeness than nonessential genes in protein-interaction networks. In a metabolic network the closeness of nodes can identify the most important metabolites.

== In disconnected graphs ==
When a graph is not strongly connected, Gleditsch introduced in 1968 the idea of using the sum of reciprocal of distances, instead of the reciprocal of the sum of distances, with the convention $1/\infty=0$:

$$H(x)= \frac{1}{n-1}\sum_{y \neq x}\frac{1}{d(y,x)}.$$

Gleditsch's modification follows the (much later in time) general principle proposed by Marchiori and Latora (2000) that in graphs with infinite distances the harmonic mean behaves better than the arithmetic mean. Indeed, Bavelas's closeness can be described as the denormalized reciprocal of the arithmetic mean of distances, whereas Gleditsch's centrality is the reciprocal of the harmonic mean of distances.

This idea has resurfaced several times in the literature, often without the normalization factor $n-1$: under the name distance-weighted reach by Borgatti (2003), for undirected graphs under the name valued centrality by Dekker (2005), under the name nodal efficiency by Achard and Bullmore (2007), and, for the first time under the name harmonic centrality, by Rochat (2009) for undirected graphs; it was proposed once again later by Opsahl (2010). It was studied under the same name on general directed graphs by Boldi and Vigna (2014). This idea is also quite similar to market potential proposed in Harris (1954) which now often goes by the term market access.

== Variants ==
Dangalchev (2006), in a work on network vulnerability proposes for undirected graphs a different definition:

$$D(x)=\sum_{y\neq x}\frac{1}{2^{d(y,x)}}.$$

This definition is used effectively for disconnected graphs and allows to create convenient formulae for graph operations. For example:

If graph $G_1 + G_2$ is created by linking node $p$ of graph $G_1$ to node $q$ of graph $G_2$ then the combined closeness is:

$$D(G_1+G_2) = D(G_1) + D(G_2) + (1+D(p))(1+D(q));$$

if graph $G_1 + G_2$ is created by collapsing node $p$ of graph $G_1$ and node $q$ of graph $G_2$ into one node then the closeness is:

$$D(G_1+G_2) = D(G_1) + D(G_2) + 2 D(p) D(q).$$

If graph $S(G)$ is the shadow graph of graph $G$, which has $n$ nodes, then $S(G)$ closeness is:

$$D(S(G)) = 4 D(G) + \frac{n}{2}.$$

If graph $T(G)$ is the thorn graph of graph $G$, which has $n$ nodes, then $T(G)$ closeness is:

$$D(T(G)) = \frac{9}{4} D(G) + n.$$

The natural generalization of this definition is:

$$D(x)=\sum_{y\neq x}\ {\alpha^{d(y,x)}},$$

where $\alpha$ belongs to (0,1). As $\alpha$ increases from 0 to 1, the generalized closeness changes from local characteristic (degree) to global (number of connected nodes).

The information centrality of Stephenson and Zelen (1989) is another closeness measure, which computes the harmonic mean of the resistance distances towards a vertex x, which is smaller if x has many paths of small resistance connecting it to other vertices.

In the classic definition of the closeness centrality, the spread of information is modeled by the use of shortest paths. This model might not be the most realistic for all types of communication scenarios. Thus, related definitions have been discussed to measure closeness, like the random walk closeness centrality introduced by Noh and Rieger (2004). It measures the speed with which randomly walking messages reach a vertex from elsewhere in the graph. Hierarchical closeness of Tran and Kwon (2014) is an extended closeness centrality to deal still in another way with the limitation of closeness in graphs that are not strongly connected. The hierarchical closeness explicitly includes information about the range of other nodes that can be affected by the given node.

== See also ==
- Centrality
- Random walk closeness centrality
- Betweenness centrality
