= Linton Freeman =

American structuralist sociologist (1927–2018)

Linton Clarke Freeman
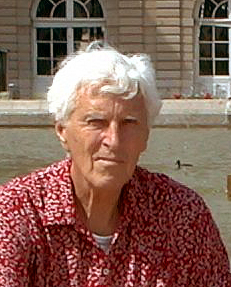
- Born: 1927; Chicago, Illinois, U.S.
- Died: August 17, 2018 (aged 91)
- Education: Northwestern University (Ph.D. 1956), University of Hawaiʻi at Mānoa (M.A. 1953), Roosevelt University (B.A. 1952)
- Known for: social network, centrality
- Scientific career
- Fields: social network
- Institutions: Syracuse University, University of Pittsburgh, University of Hawaiʻi at Mānoa, Lehigh University, University of California, Irvine
- Website: moreno.ss.uci.edu

Linton Clarke Freeman (1927 – August 17, 2018) was an American structuralist sociologist known for his work in social networks. He was an emeritus professor of sociology at the University of California, Irvine. Freeman developed the first measure of betweenness centrality. He was the founding editor of the journal Social Networks which began publishing in 1979.

Freeman died on August 17, 2018, at the age of 91.

== Book ==
Freeman, Linton C. 2004. The Development of Social Network Analysis: A Study in the Sociology of Science. Vancouver: Empirical Press.
