= John Ronald Seeley =

English sociologist and author

Herbert John Ronald Friedeburg-Seeley (February 21, 1913 - December 16, 2007) was an English sociologist and author in Canada and the United States. Some of his works include The Americanization of the Unconscious and, with R. Alexander Sim and Elizabeth W. Loosley, Crestwood Heights.

== Early life ==
Seeley was the son of Emil Friedeburg, a wealthy Prussian grain executive in a food business which was a predecessor of what is presently Bunge Global. His mother was English citizen Lilly Etta Seeley. The reason why, when and by whom his surname was taken from that of his mother is not currently known. Seeley was born into the aristocratic class of London. He had three brothers- Frank, Cyril, and Michael. The boys were educated at various European boarding schools. At age 17, Seeley left England for North America where he would enter higher education.

== Career ==
Seeley served in the Canadian Army from 1939 to 1945. He then completed a graduate degree and a doctoral degree at the University of Chicago. He and his young family then lived in the upscale Forest Hills area of Toronto for several years while he worked on a project there. The fraction of the Forest Hills work which Seeley reported in his book Crestwood Heights was his first major publication and established his professional presence. It was the first full-scale sociological study of a suburban community and the first psychologically oriented anthropological study of a community as such. Some of his works include The Americanization of the Unconscious Seeley went on to help York University to obtain a charter. Seeley then moved his family to Boston, after which he taught as an adjunct professor at Brandeis University while he worked as a sociologist at the Massachusetts Institute of Technology. Finally, he worked at Stanford University, settling his family in California.
