= Core–periphery structure =

Network theory model

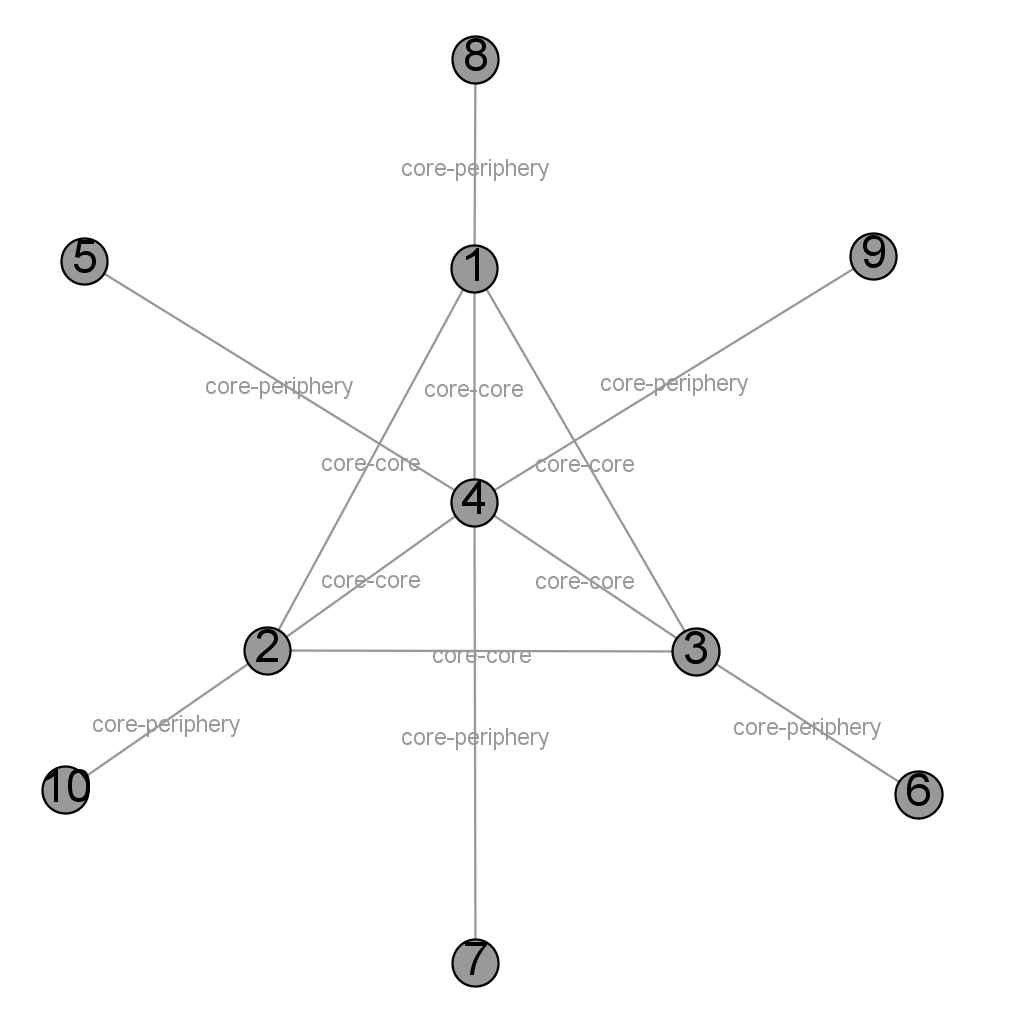
Network with an idealized core–periphery structure

Core–periphery structure is a network theory model.

== Models of core–periphery structures ==
There are two main intuitions behind the definition of core–periphery network structures; one assumes that a network can only have one core, whereas the other allows for the possibility of multiple cores. These two intuitive conceptions serve as the basis for two modes of core–periphery structures.

=== Discrete model ===
This model assumes that there are two classes of nodes. The first consists of a cohesive core sub-graph in which the nodes are highly interconnected, and the second is made up of a peripheral set of nodes that is loosely connected to the core. In an ideal core–periphery matrix, core nodes are adjacent to other core nodes and to some peripheral nodes while peripheral nodes are not connected with other peripheral nodes (Borgatti & Everett, 2000, p. 378). This requires, however, that there be an a priori partition that indicates whether a node belongs to the core or periphery.

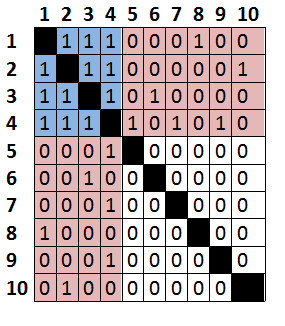
In this idealized matrix, the blue block represents core-core links, the white block represents the absence of periphery links and the red quadrants represent core–periphery ties.

=== Continuous model ===
This model allows for the existence of three or more partitions of node classes. However, including more classes makes modifications to the discrete model more difficult. Borgatti & Everett (1999) suggest that, in order to overcome this problem, each node be assigned a measure of ‘coreness’ that will determine its class. Nevertheless, the threshold of what constitutes a high ‘coreness’ value must be justified theoretically.

== Discussion ==
Hubs are commonly found in empirical networks and pose a problem for community detection as they usually have strong ties to many communities. Identifying core–periphery structures can help circumvent this problem by categorizing hubs as part of the network's core (Rombach et al., 2014, p. 160). Likewise, though all core nodes have high centrality measures, not all nodes with high centrality measures belong to the core. It is possible to find that a set of highly central nodes in a graph does not make an internally cohesive subgraph (Borgatti & Everett, 2000)...

== Use in economics and geography ==
The concept was first introduced into economics as "centre-periphery" by Raúl Prebisch in the 1950s, but the origin of the idea could ultimately be traced back to Thünen's Isolated State (1826). Observed trade flows and diplomatic ties among countries fit this structure. Paul Krugman (1991) suggests that when transportation costs are low enough manufacturers concentrate in a single region known as the core and other regions (the periphery) limit themselves to the supply of agricultural goods.

== See also ==
- World-systems theory
- Core countries
- Semi-periphery countries
- Periphery countries
- Degeneracy (graph theory)
