= Ulrik Brandes =

German network scientist

Ulrik Brandes is a German computer scientist, social scientist, and network scientist known for his work on centrality, cluster analysis, and graph drawing. He is Professor for Social Networks at ETH Zurich in Switzerland, in the Department of Humanities, Social and Political Sciences.

== Education and career ==
Brandes earned a diploma from RWTH Aachen University in 1994, and a PhD from the University of Konstanz in 1999. His dissertation, Layout of Graph Visualizations, concerned graph drawing, and was jointly supervised by Dorothea Wagner and Michael Kaufmann.

After completing a habilitation in 2002, and taking an assistant professorship at the University of Passau, he returned to Konstanz as a professor in 2003, before moving to ETH Zurich.

== Books and Researches ==
Brandes is the coauthor of the book Studying Social Networks: A Guide to Empirical Research (Campus Verlag / Chicago University Press, 2012, with Marina Hennig, Jürgen Pfeffer, and Ines Mergel). His edited volumes include Network Analysis: Methodological Foundations (Springer, 2005, edited with Thomas Erlebach) as well as several conference proceedings.

He had performed a research about collaboration structure in Wikipedia in 2009.
