= Stephen Borgatti =

American business professor and author

Stephen Peter Borgatti is an American business professor and author, currently the Professor and Chellgren Endowed Chair of Corporate Strategy at the Gatton College of Business and Economics, University of Kentucky. His work is highly cited by peers and held in libraries worldwide.
