= Ingredient-flavor network =

Concept in food science

In food science, ingredient-flavor networks are networks describing the sharing of flavor compounds of culinary ingredients. In the bipartite form, an ingredient-flavor network consist of two different types of nodes: the ingredients used in the recipes and the flavor compounds that contributes to the flavor of each ingredients. The links connecting different types of nodes are undirected, represent certain compound occur in each ingredients. The ingredient-flavor network can also be projected in the ingredient or compound space where nodes are ingredients or compounds, links represents the sharing of the same compounds to different ingredients or the coexistence in the same ingredient of different compounds.

== History ==
In 2011, Yong-Yeol Ahn, Sebastian E. Ahnert, James P. Bagrow and Albert-László Barabási investigated the ingredient-flavor networks of North American, Latin American, Western European, Southern European and East Asian cuisines. Based on culinary repository epicurious.com, allrecipes.com and menupan.com, 56,498 recipes were included in the survey.

The efforts to apply network analysis on foods also occurred in the work of Kinouchi and Chun-Yuen Teng, with the former examined the relationship between ingredients and recipes, and the latter derived the ingredient-ingredient networks of both compliments and substitutions. Yet Ahn's ingredient-flavor network was constructed based on the molecular level understanding of culinary networks and received wide attention

== Properties ==
According to Ahn, in the total number of 56,498 recipes studied, 381 ingredients and 1021 flavor compounds were identified. On average, each ingredient connected to 51 flavor compounds.

It was found that in comparison with random pairing of ingredients and flavor compounds, North American cuisines tend to share more compounds while East Asian cuisines tend to share fewer compounds. It was also shown that this tendency was mostly generated by the frequently used ingredients in each cuisines.

== Food pairing ==
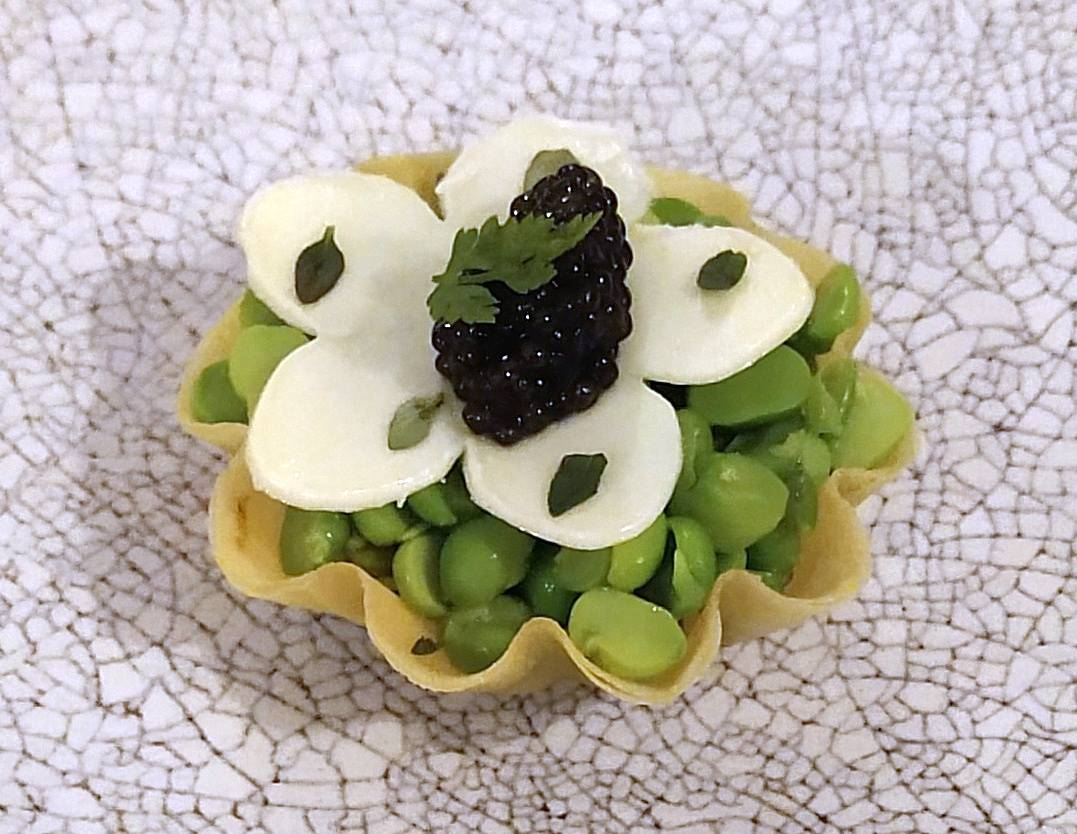
A dish combining the complementary flavors of caviar and white chocolate

An important feature that the ingredient-flavor network showed is the principle of food pairing. A well known hypothesis states that ingredients sharing flavor compounds are more likely to taste well together than ingredients that do not. However, the sensory test by Miriam Kort, etc. claimed that the shared compound hypothesis can be debatable.

According to Ahn, the food pairing pattern changes in different cuisines. North American recipes tends to obey the shared compound hypothesis while East Asian cuisines tend to avoid it. Besides the spatial variance, Kush R. Varshney, Lav R. Varshney, Jun Wang, and Daniel Myers also showed the time variance in food pairing by comparing the modern European recipes with the Medieval European recipes. They concluded that the Medieval cuisine tend to share more compounds than the cuisine today.

== See also ==
- Albert-László Barabási
- Bipartite graph
- Bipartite network projection
- Food science
- Food pairing
- Graph theory
- Network science
- Network theory
- Sensory analysis
