= Food Quality and Preference =

- Discipline: Food Science
- Language: English
- Edited by: Armand V. Cardello, Sara R. Jaeger, John Prescott

Publication details
- History: 1988–present
- Publisher: Elsevier
- Frequency: 8/year
- Impact factor: 6.345 (2021)

Standard abbreviations
- ISO 4: Food Qual. Prefer.

Indexing
- ISSN: 0950-3293

Links
- Journal homepage; Online archive

Food Quality and Preference is a peer-reviewed scientific journal in the field of sensory and consumer science, published by Elsevier.

Its scope covers consumer and market research, sensory science, sensometrics and sensory evaluation, nutrition and food choice, as well as food research, product development and sensory quality assurance. It is the official journal of "The Sensometric Society" and "The European Sensory Science Society". The journal also publishes special issues associated with topical sensory conference worldwide, such as the Pangborn Sensory Science Symposium, Eurosense, and Sensometrics.

== Abstracting and indexing ==
The journal is abstracted and indexed in:

- BIOSIS Previews
- Current Contents/Agriculture, Biology, and Environmental Sciences
- Embase
- Food Science & Technology Abstracts
- PsycINFO
- Science Citation Index
- Science Citation Index Expanded
- Scopus

According to the Journal Citation Reports, the journal has a 2021 impact factor of 6.345.

== See also ==
- Consumer science
- European Sensory Network
- Food science
- Pangborn Sensory Science Symposium
- Sensory science
