= Hedonic scale =

Sensory evaluation tool

The hedonic scale is a sensory evaluation tool used to measure the degree of pleasure or liking of a product or service. The scale usually consists of 9 levels ranging from 1 to 9, or "dislike extremely" to "like extremely".

The hedonic scale is widely used for consumer acceptance testing.

== Overview ==
The main characteristics of the scale are that each category is associated with a verbal descriptor from “Dislike extremely” to “Like extremely” and that the scale has a neutral category, “Neither Like nor Dislike”. The scale offers a chance for respondents to give extreme end answers and express their strong positive or negative feelings, such as "Dislike extremely" (1). The bipolar nature of the scale and the assumption of equal psychological distance between successive scale points make it a useful tool for some researchers.

Hedonic scale
Score	Interpretation
1	Dislike extremely
2	Dislike very much
3	Dislike moderately
4	Dislike slightly
5	Neither like nor dislike
6	Like slightly
7	Like moderately
8	Like very much
9	Like extremely

== History and Development ==
The hedonic scale originated from the study of hedonic emotions, meaning subjective experiences of pleasure and displeasure. Coming from the Greek word hēdonē, meaning “pleasure”, it was designed to understand individuals’ responses to a specific stimulus. The scale is based on the roots of psychophysics and affective science, which attempt to understand how to quantify emotional human responses to physical stimuli.

The 9-point hedonic scale was created by Peryam and Pilgrim in the 1950s, initially to measure food preferences amongst soldiers in the U.S. Armed Forces. The developers applied the graphic rating scale, which experimental psychologists used to measure various psychological phenomena, for this case measuring the “hedonic” value of foods.

U.S Armed Forces-Hedonic Scale
FOOD ITEM	LIKE	LIKE	LIKE	LIKE	INDIFFERENT	DISLIKE	DISLIKE	DISLIKE	DISLIKE
Cream Gravy	Like Extremely	Like Very Much	Like Moderately	Like Slightly	Neither Like Nor Dislike	Dislike Slightly	Dislike Moderately	Dislike Very Much	Dislike Extremely
Bread Pudding	Like Extremely	Like Very Much	Like Moderately	Like Slightly	Neither Like Nor Dislike	Dislike Slightly	Dislike Moderately	Dislike Very Much	Dislike Extremely
Cheese	Like Extremely	Like Very Much	Like Moderately	Like Slightly	Neither Like Nor Dislike	Dislike Slightly	Dislike Moderately	Dislike Very Much	Dislike Extremely
French Fried Onions	Like Extremely	Like Very Much	Like Moderately	Like Slightly	Neither Like Nor Dislike	Dislike Slightly	Dislike Moderately	Dislike Very Much	Dislike Extremely
Lettuce Wedges	Like Extremely	Like Very Much	Like Moderately	Like Slightly	Neither Like Nor Dislike	Dislike Slightly	Dislike Moderately	Dislike Very Much	Dislike Extremely

=== Current Use ===
Since then, it has adapted to the modern food industry to assess consumer acceptance and the sensory quality of food. Furthermore, it has become the most widely used scale in research studying hedonic perception.

== Hedonic Scale Adapted For Children ==
A number of hedonic scales for children have been proposed, some using pictures (often faces), some using words, and some a combination of pictures and words. These newly proposed scales were adapted to suit children’s language, for example, as illustrated in the table below, replacing terms such as “extremely like” with “super good”.

Traditional Adult Hedonic Scale	P&amp;K Hedonic Scale For Children
Like Extremely	Super Good
Like Very Much	Really Good
Like Moderately	Good
Like Slightly	Just a Little Good
Neither Like Nor Dislike	Maybe Good or Maybe Bad
Dislike Slightly	Just a Little Bad
Dislike Moderately	Bad
Dislike Very Much	Really Bad
Dislike Extremely	Super Bad

Rather than using numbers to show the value of a product, the children’s hedonic scale includes different faces with various facial expressions, e.g., a smiling face suggesting “happiness”. However, these faces may unintentionally create bias or confusion. For example, children may choose the ‘happy’ face because they prefer the image itself, rather than because it represents their opinion about the food they tasted.

Other researchers highlight that the eyes and the mouth are particularly important to the interpretation of the facial expression, making the design of the children’s version of the hedonic scale especially crucial to its effectiveness.

== Cultural Considerations ==
Despite its widespread use, the hedonic scale may not be applicable due to cultural and linguistic differences. This can affect the respondents’ interpretations of the scale, specifically when it comes to translating them, as some terms will not have the same meaning when translated. For instance, Spanish-speaking participants may interpret “extremely” differently, potentially skewing responses. Similarly, in many Asian cultures, respondents tend to avoid extreme responses to maintain harmony. This can result in data clustering around the midpoint, reducing the sensitivity of the scale.

The interpretation and understanding of the facial expression used for the children’s hedonic scale is not universal across different cultures. For example, a smiling face may not convey the same emotion amongst different societies, highlighting the importance of adapting each hedonic scale to the culture of the country it’s being used in to ensure accurate results.

== Advantages ==
=== Simple to understand ===
The scale is easy and quick to complete, which makes it suitable for people of all ages and different literacy levels. Due to its simplicity, it increases the likelihood of people responding to the scale and taking part in research.

=== Ability to Quantify Responses ===
The scale can turn emotions and preferences, such as liking or disliking stimuli, into numerical values. This enables researchers to perform calculations and statistical analysis of personal preferences, increasing the objectivity and reliability of the research.

=== Real-world application ===
The scale is widely used within the food industry for practical reasons, such as planning of menus; for example, items that receive low reviews can be removed. This may contribute to consumer satisfaction by improving the quality and appeal of available products, therefore increasing overall utility.

=== High face validity ===
The scale asks respondents how much they like or dislike a stimulus with clear and familiar language. This means that participants easily understand what the scale measures, hence increasing the authenticity of the responses.

== Disadvantages ==
=== Suffers from beta cultural bias ===
The scale does not translate accurately into Spanish and other Asian languages, demonstrating it lacks generalisability across cultures. The most reported complaint is the different meaning of the word “extreme” in these languages.

=== Challenging to analyse ===
The scale produces ordinal data, but it is treated as interval data for statistical analyses like ANOVA. This mismatch can make data analysis challenging, as it assumes equal spacing between response options when this may not be the case. As a result, it may lead to inaccurate conclusions and reduce the overall reliability and validity of the research findings.

=== Chance of response bias ===
The scale includes a neutral midpoint, which can result in a central tendency error, where respondents avoid using extreme ends and they don't express their real opinions. This can result in non-representative data and reduce the external validity of findings.

=== Absence of qualitative insights ===
The scale measures overall liking or disliking; however, it doesn’t reveal the specific reasons behind those responses. As a result, it struggles to understand why respondents feel a certain way, which can limit the practical element of the scale.

== See also ==
- JAR scale
