= Food science =

Applied science devoted to the study of food

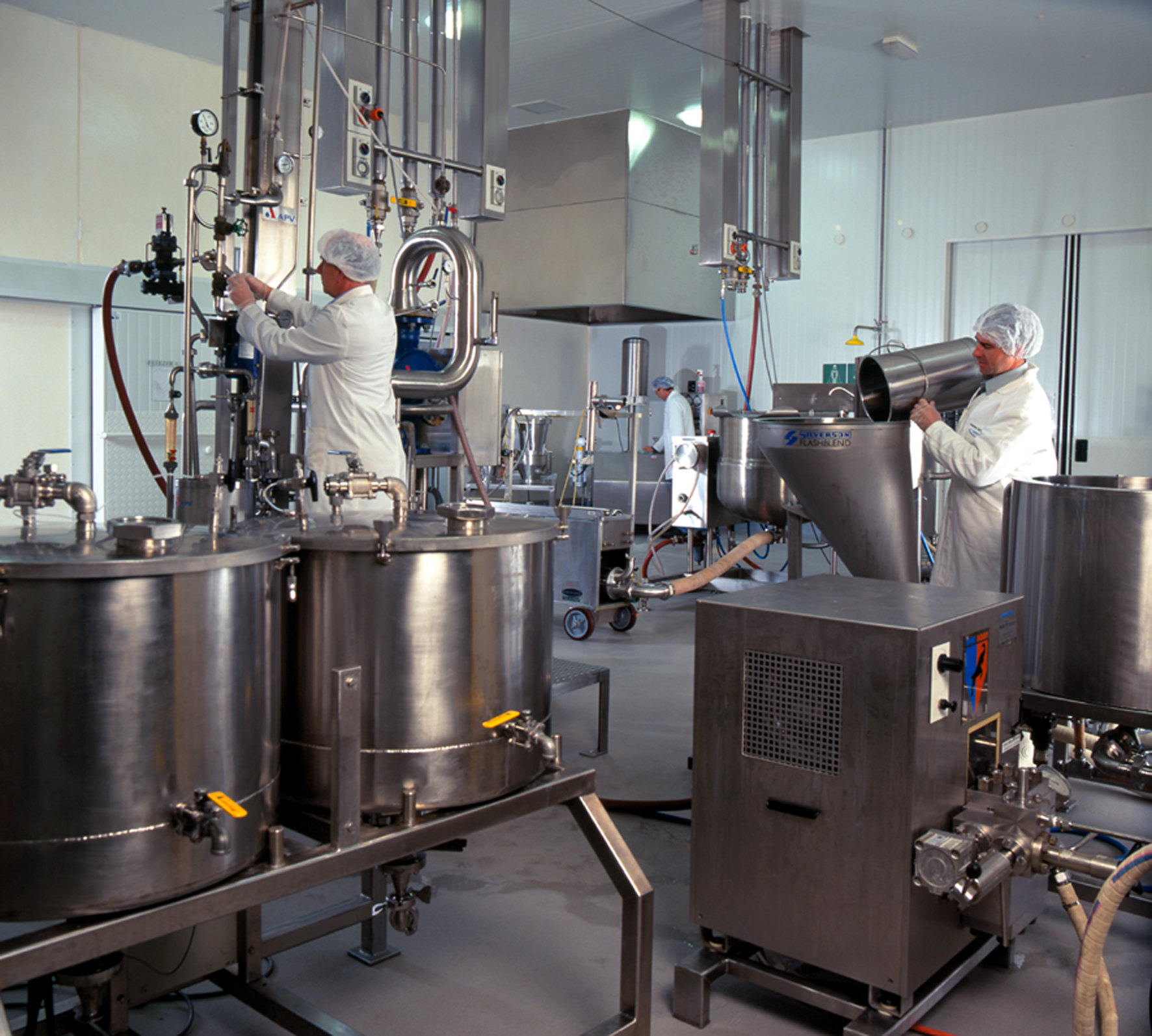
Food scientists working at a laboratory in Australia

Food science (or bromatology) is the study of food and its chemical properties. Its scope overlaps with agricultural science and nutritional science and extends to the scientific aspects of food safety and food processing, informing the development of food technology.

Food science is an interdisciplinary field that integrates concepts from chemistry, physics, physiology, microbiology, and biochemistry. It evolved from early preservation practices such as salting to an organized research-driven field central to modern food production. The field includes several subdisciplines such as food chemistry, food technology, and molecular gastronomy, which examine the composition and processes used to produce and preserve food.

Food scientists develop new products, design processing methods to produce these foods, select packaging materials, conduct shelf life and sensory evaluation studies of products using survey panels or potential consumers, and perform microbiological and chemical testing. They may study more fundamental phenomena that are directly linked to the production of food products and its properties.

== Definition ==
The Institute of Food Technologists defines food science as "the discipline in which the engineering, biological, and physical sciences are used to study the nature of foods, the causes of deterioration, the principles underlying food processing, and the improvement of foods for the consuming public". The textbook Food Science defines food science in simpler terms as "the application of sciences and engineering to study the physical, chemical, and biochemical nature of foods and the principles of food processing".

== Background ==
Food science developed gradually from traditional food preservation practices into a formal scientific discipline during the 19th and 20th centuries. Yet, early food preservation methods such as salting, drying, and fermentation were used for thousands of years to extend the shelf life of perishable foods. Archeological evidence revealed that ancient civilizations, including those of Egypt, preserved fish and meat with salt as early as 2000 BCE. Throughout much of human history, the ability to preserve food safely played a crucial role in sustaining communities during times of limited food availibility and war.

== Disciplines ==
Some of the subdisciplines of food science are described below.

=== Food chemistry ===
Food chemistry is the study of chemical processes and interactions of all biological and non-biological components of foods. The biological substances include such items as meat, poultry, lettuce, beer, and milk. It is similar to biochemistry in its main components such as enzymes, carbohydrates, lipids, and protein, but it also includes areas such as water, vitamins, minerals, food additives, flavors, and colors. This discipline also encompasses how products change under certain food processing techniques and ways either to enhance or to prevent them from happening.

==== Food physical chemistry ====
Food physical chemistry is the study of both physical and chemical interactions in foods in terms of physical and chemical principles applied to food systems, as well as the application of physicochemical techniques and instrumentation for the study and analysis of foods.

=== Food engineering ===
Food engineering is the industrial processes used to manufacture food. It involves coming up with novel approaches for manufacturing, packaging, delivering, ensuring quality, ensuring safety, and devising techniques to transform raw ingredients into wholesome food options.

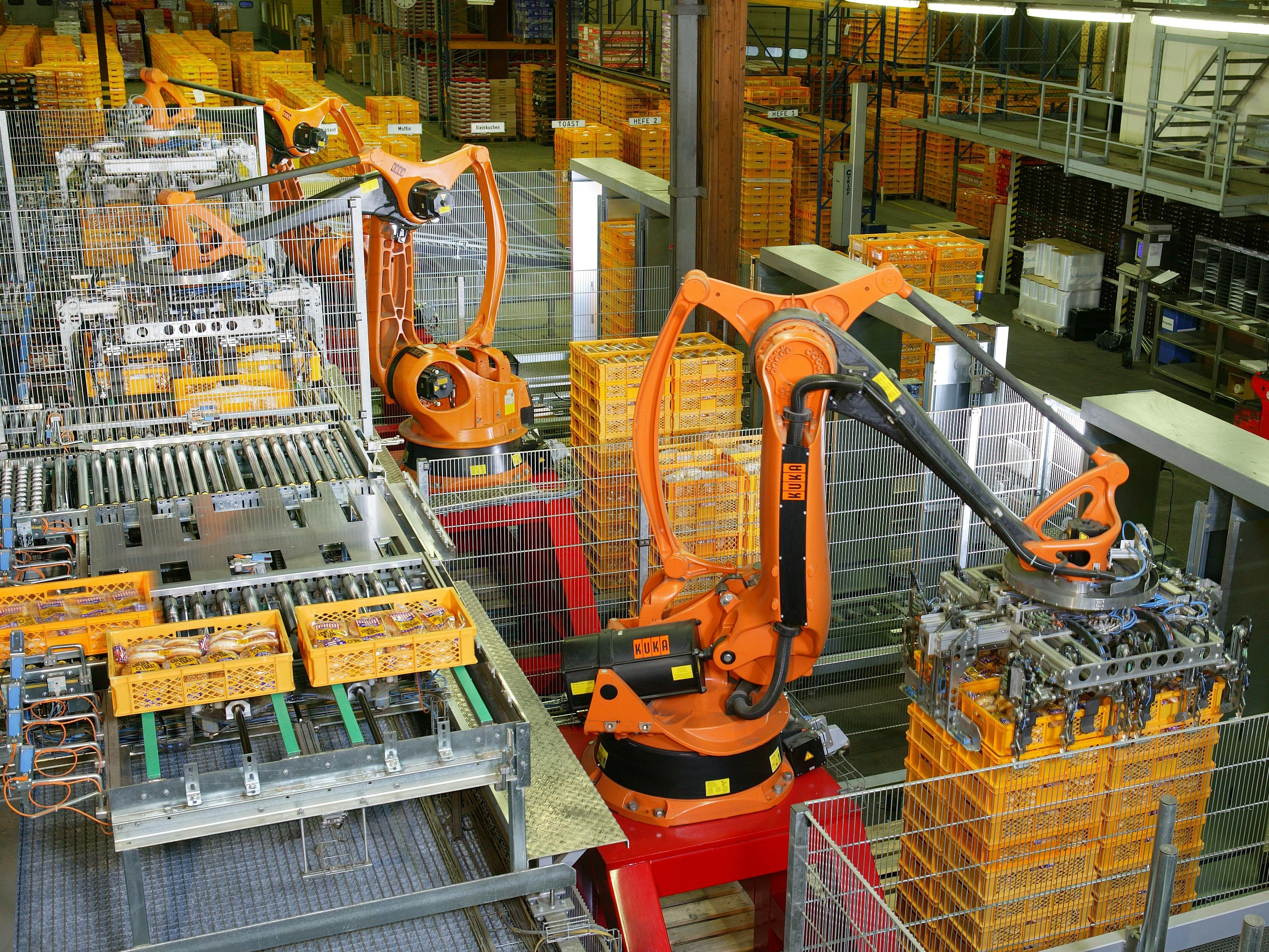
A pizza factory in Germany, an example of food engineering

=== Food microbiology ===
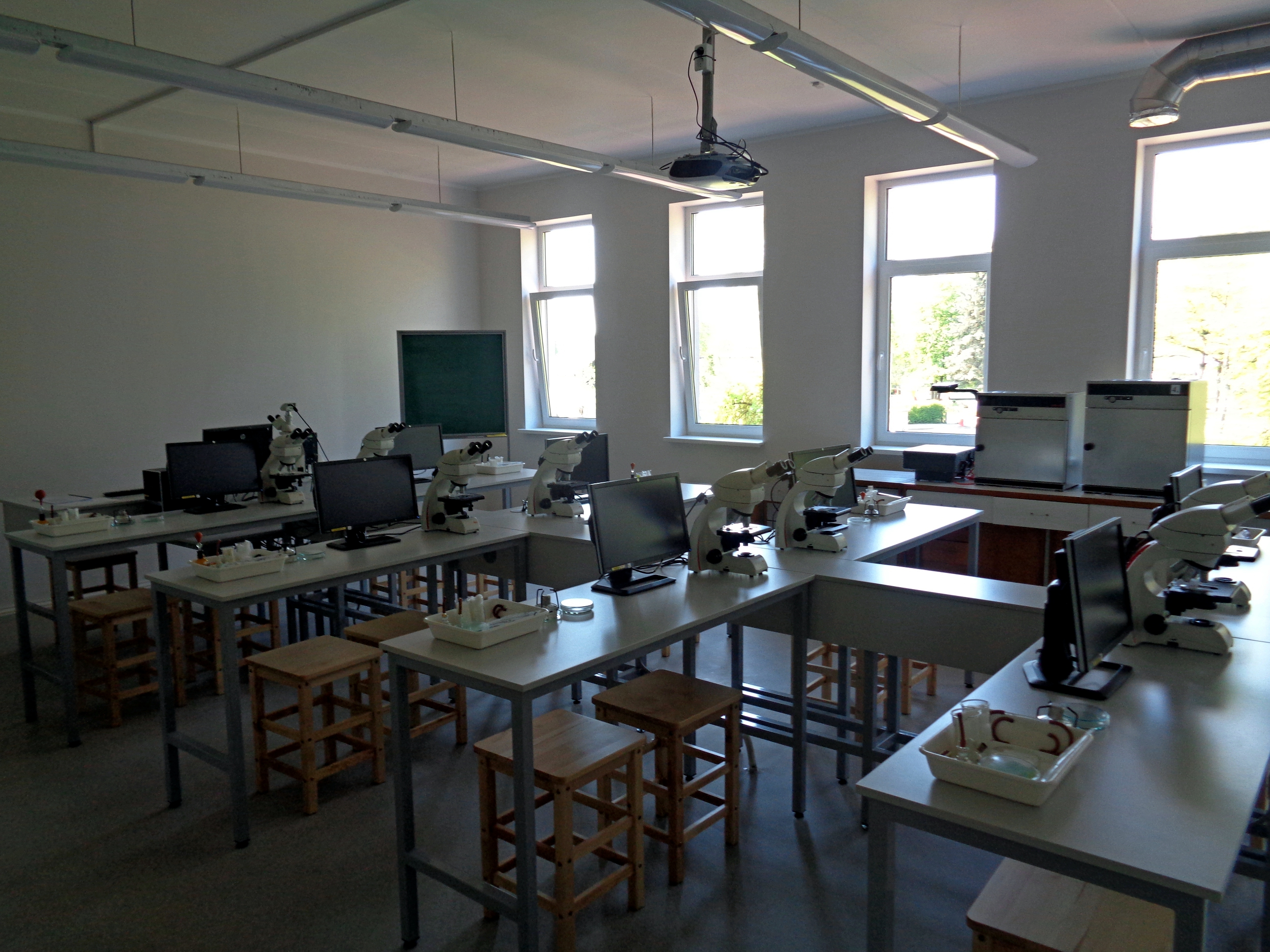
Food microbiology laboratory at the Faculty of Food Technology, Latvia University of Life Sciences and Technologies

Food microbiology is the study of the microorganisms that inhabit, create, or contaminate food, including the study of microorganisms causing food spoilage. "Good" bacteria, however, such as probiotics, are becoming increasingly important in food science. In addition, microorganisms are essential for the production of foods such as cheese, yogurt, bread, beer, wine and, other fermented foods.

=== Food technology ===
Food technology is the technological aspect. Early scientific research into food technology concentrated on food preservation. Nicolas Appert's development in 1810 of the canning process was a decisive event. The process was not called canning then and Appert did not really know the principle on which his process worked, but canning has had a major impact on food preservation techniques.

=== Foodomics ===
In 2009, Foodomics was defined as "a discipline that studies the Food and Nutrition domains through the application and integration of advanced -omics technologies to improve consumer's well-being, health, and knowledge". Foodomics requires the combination of food chemistry, biological sciences, and data analysis.

Foodomics greatly helps scientists in the area of food science and nutrition to gain better access to data, which is used to analyze the effects of food on human health, etc. It is believed to be another step towards a better understanding of the development and application of technology and food. Moreover, the study of foodomics leads to other omics sub-disciplines, including nutrigenomics which is the integration of the study of nutrition, genes, and omics.

=== Molecular gastronomy ===
Molecular gastronomy is a subdiscipline of food science that seeks to investigate the physical and chemical transformations of ingredients that occur in cooking. The field integrates chemistry, physics, and neuroscience to understand how factors such as ingredient composition, influence flavor perception.

=== Quality control ===
Quality control is the process used to ensure that a product or service meets an established set of standards and customer expectations. It involves establishing criteria used for defining quality and identifying problems that affect consistency.

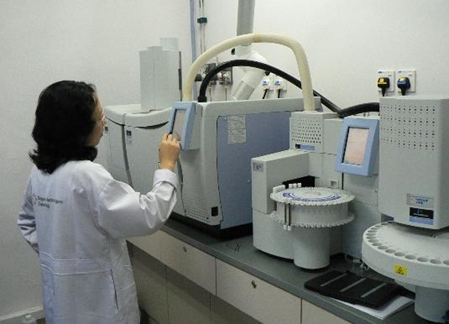
A technician performing quality control

=== Sensory analysis ===
Sensory analysis is the study of how consumer's senses perceive food.

=== Careers ===
The five most common college degrees leading to a career in food science are: Food science/technology (66%), biological sciences (12%), business/marketing (10%), nutrition (9%) and chemistry (8%).

Careers available to food scientists include food technologists, research and development (R&D), quality control, flavor chemistry, laboratory director, food analytical chemist and technical sales.

The five most common positions for food scientists are food scientist/technologist (19%), product developer (12%), quality assurance/control director (8%), other R&D/scientific/technical (7%), and director of research (5%).

== Research organizations ==
=== Europe ===
The European Federation of Food Science and Technology, or EFFoST, is a European network that brings together professionals working in food science, food engineering, and related disciplines. EFFoST seeks to contribute to the development of safe, nutritious, and sustainable food systems in response to changing global demands. As a regional branch of the International Union of Food Science and Technology (IUFoST), EFFoST partners with over 130 institutions across Europe.

=== Australia ===
The Commonwealth Scientific and Industrial Research Organisation (CSIRO) is the federal government agency for scientific research in Australia. CSIRO maintains more than 50 sites across Australia and biological control research stations in France and Mexico. It has nearly 6,500 employees.

=== South Korea ===
The Korean Society of Food Science and Technology, or KoSFoST, is a South Korean nonprofit organization that supports academic and professional collaboration in food science. Established in 1968, it serves as a forum for scientists and engineers working in areas related to food production, biotechnology, and product development. KoSFoST serves as the Korean regional branch of the International Union of Science and Technology.

=== United States ===
The Institute of Food Technologists (IFT), headquartered in Chicago, Illinois, is a major U.S. professional society for food science and food technology.

== See also ==
- Aseptic processing
- Cooking
- Dietary supplement
- Food fortification
- Food grading
- Food rheology
- Food storage
- Foodpairing
- Ingredient-flavor network
- Neurogastronomy
- Nutraceutical
- Space food
- Taste

== Publications ==
=== Books ===
- Potter, Norman N., and Joseph H. Hotchkiss. Food Science. 5th ed., Chapman & Hall, 1995.
- Mudambi, Sumati Rajagopal, et al. Food Science. Rev. 2nd ed., New Age International P Ltd., Publishers, 2006.
- Owusu-Apenten, R. K, and Ernest R Vieira. Elementary Food Science. 5th edition., Springer, 2023.
- Hogan, Christa. Food Science. 1st ed., ABDO Publishing Company, 2024.

=== Journals ===
- Applied Food Biotechnology
- Chemical Senses
- Food and Bioprocess Technology
- Food Chemistry
- Food Research International
- Food Quality and Preference
- Journal of Dairy Science
- Journal of Food Science
- Journal of Sensory Studies
- Journal of Texture Studies
- LWT – Food Science and Technology
- Trends in Food Science & Technology
