= Whisky with food =

Pairing whiskies with complementary foods

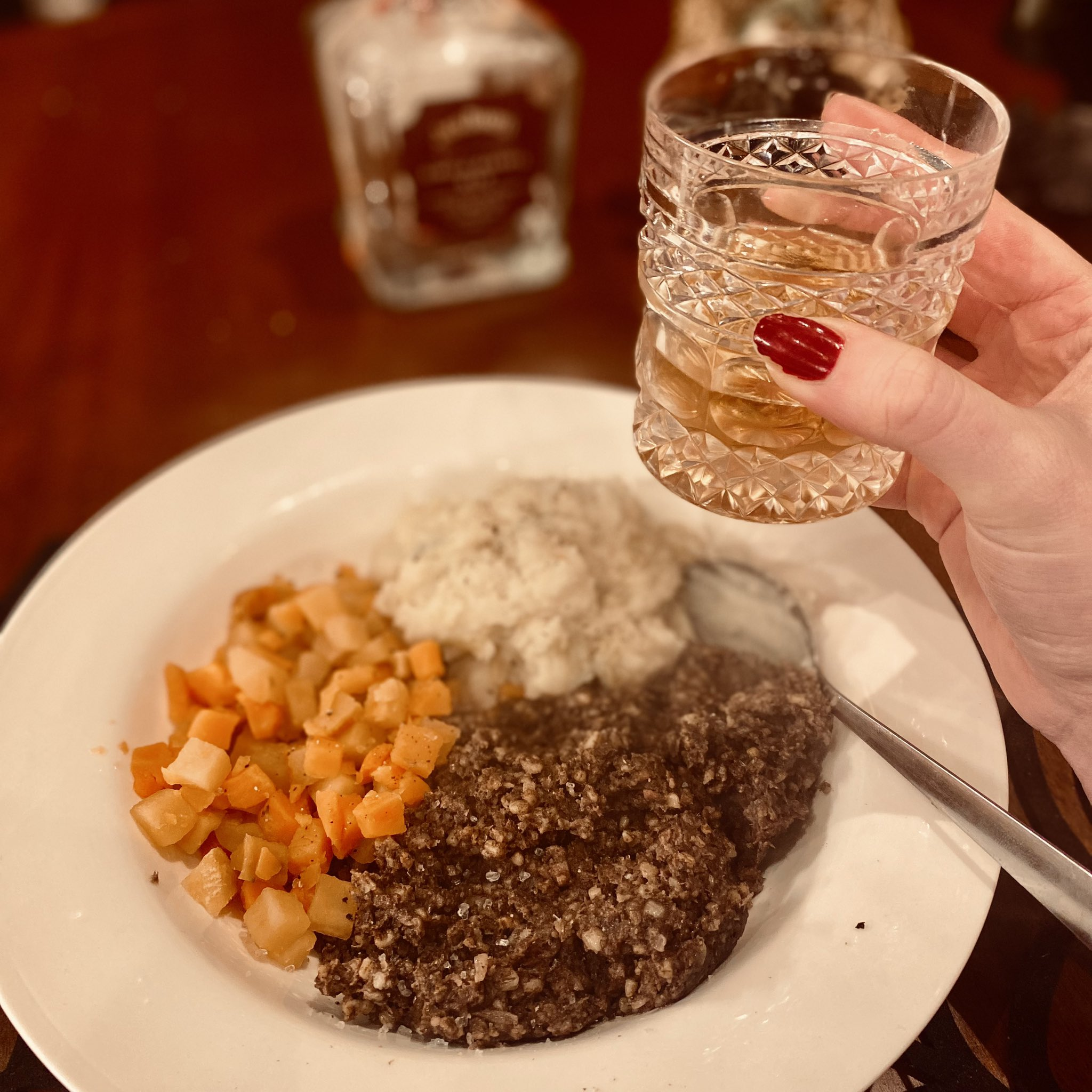
Haggis with neeps and tatties and a glass of whisky, at a Burns supper

The idea of drinking whisky with food is considered unorthodox by many, but there is a growing interest in pairing whiskies with complementary foods. The Scotch whisky industry has been keen to promote this. Single malts, pot-still whiskies, bourbons, and rye whiskies offer an interesting range of tastes and aromas, which are just as varied as wine. Jake Wallis Simons compares whiskies in bourbon casks to white wines, due to their lighter flavor, and those in sherry casks to red wines, with their greater fruitiness. A few Scottish cook books contain reference to the use of whisky in cooking, and a few traditional Scottish recipes that use whisky exist.

Whisky is also used as an ingredient used in the preparation of various dishes and foods.

== History ==
=== Whisky and food ===
Many people are skeptical about the idea of enjoying whiskey with a meal. This is in contrast to other alcoholic beverages such as wine, ale, and beer that have a dated history of being consumed with meals. In the past, consuming whisky with a meal was not influenced by fashion, but by social and geographical position: in the Scottish Lowlands, whisky was consumed only by those at the bottom of the social scale, whereas the upper class would enjoy claret or rum punch with their food. From a geographical standpoint, whisky was consumed more often in colder climates because of the warming effect it was thought to have on the body; in truth, however, alcohol is a vasodilator, (meaning it causes blood vessels to expand). As blood vessels expands, they give off heat, making one's body feel warmer even though the body is actually losing heat. Today there are a growing number of connoisseurs who pair whiskies with specific foods in order to enhance the flavour of both. This is reflected by the increasing number of books and websites specifically dedicated to whisky and food pairings.

Burns Night has a tradition of consuming a shot of whisky with haggis.

=== Whisky and cooking ===
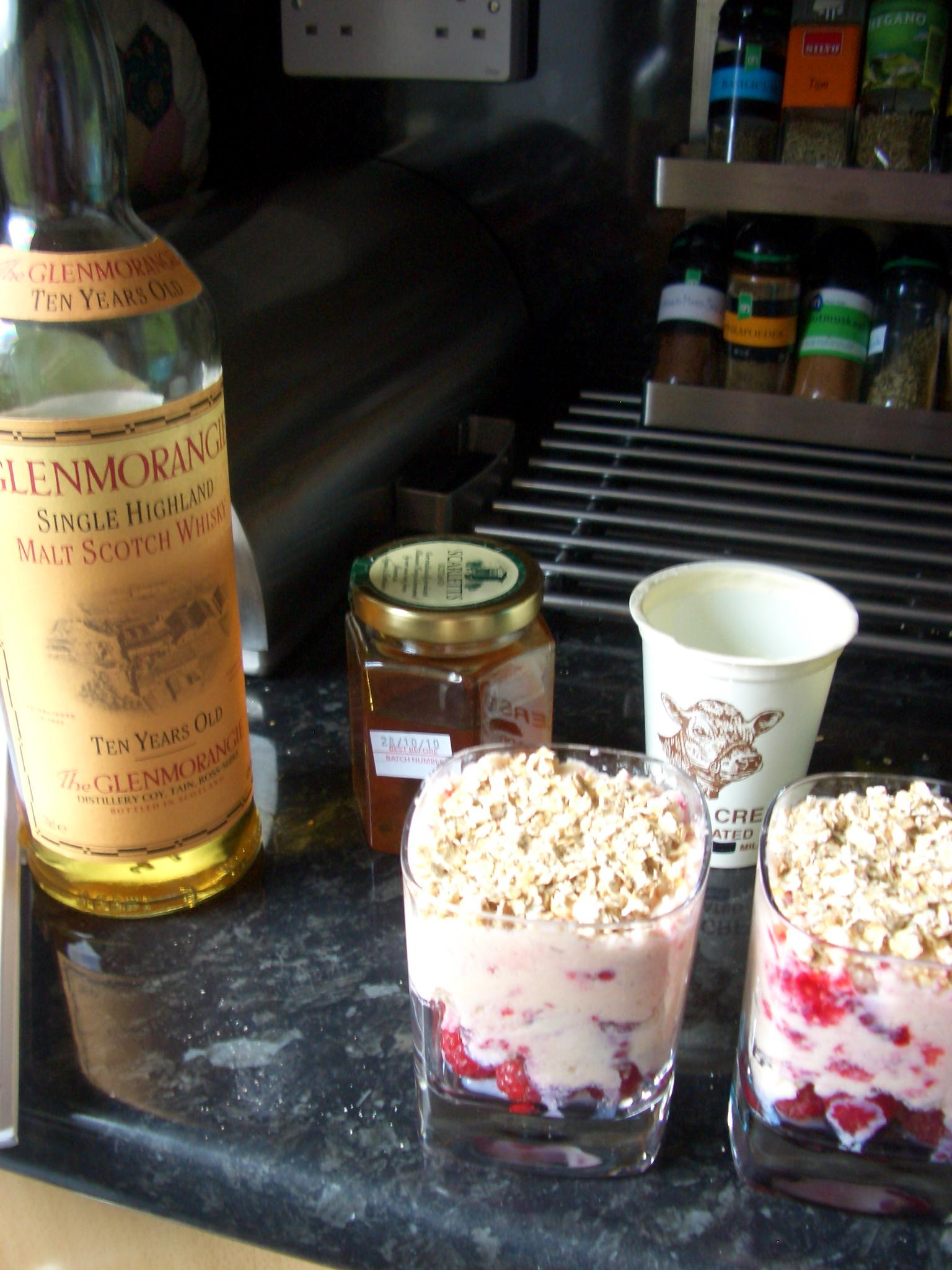
Cranachan desserts made with whisky

Few Scottish cook books contain reference to the use of whisky in cooking. There are only a few traditional recipes such as cranachan and trifle. Most cooks and professional chefs only consider the use of brandy, sherry, or port in the cooking process.

There are many theories as to why whisky has been overlooked. One is that whisky was considered too precious a drink and its use in cooking would be a sacrilege. On the other hand, another theory said that whisky was its own worst enemy, because of its harsh flavours and aromas. Today chefs and cooks are experimenting more with whisky in recipes. In Kentucky, a bourbon-style cooking school has been established by Jim Beam with demonstrations each September at the Kentucky Bourbon Festival.

== Whisky and food pairings ==
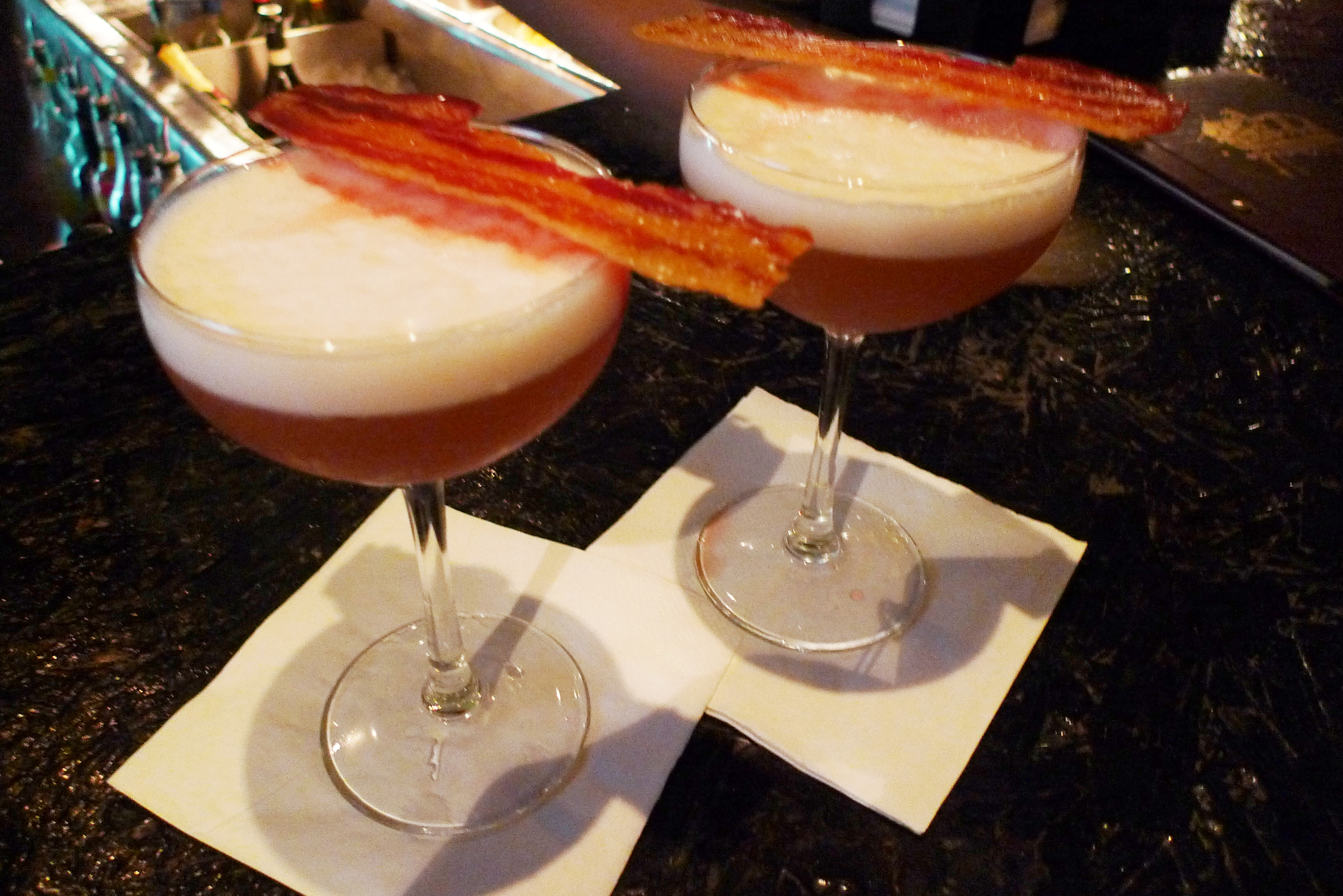
A Bacon and Egg Martini cocktail, with bacon-infused Jack Daniel's whiskey

When pairing whisky with food, the characteristics of the meal it will complement is taken into consideration. Whisky and food pairing may complement and enhance one-another, such as a highly medicinal single malt (Laphroaig), paired with an apple crumble. Likewise, a high cocoa content dark chocolate pairs well with the subtle chocolate flavours in a Lagavulin, while a light-bodied Lowland single malt may go well with a fish dish. A heavier, more aromatic whisky may go well with beef or duck. Lighter, fruitier Japanese whiskies like Yamazaki (best served chilled) may go well with tuna and salmon in sushi and sashimi dishes. These combinations illustrate that there has to be a balance between the competing flavours, so that neither the whisky or the dish are allowed to dominate and overwhelm the flavours of the other. A smoky, peaty or peppery whisky may go well with oysters and smoked fish. There are "sweet and sour" pairings. Chilli heat can be matched to sweetness in some whiskies. Lastly, an acidic whisky can cut through a very sweet dish as well as neutralizing excessive fat or richness in other dishes.

- Food with strong, peaty whiskies: strong, peaty whiskies such as the Islay whiskies; Lagavulin, Laphroaig, and the Bruichladdich distillery, may be complementary, with tea-smoked chicken, teriyaki salmon, plain dark chocolate, baba ghanoush, Middle Eastern style lamb meatballs or kofte and haggis and strong blue cheese.
- Food with medium bodied rich whiskies aged in sherry or European oak casks: these whiskies may go well with rich fruit cakes: Roast venison, especially with caramelised roast root vegetables, ginger biscuits, sticky toffee pudding, mature cheddar, char siu pork and seasoned or grilled steak.
- Light fragrant whisky with a touch of sweetness: the distilleries that brew such whisky are the Knockando distillery, the Jura distillery, the Glenfiddich distillery and the Glenkinchie distillery, and others. Such whisky may go well with sushi, smoked salmon, parsnip soup, bread and butter pudding, cranachan, Cullen skink (smoked haddock soup), goat's cheese and cream cheese.

Cinnamon, ginger, pepper, and star anise may provide a spice bridge between food and whisky. Grassy malts may be enhanced when a dish contains herbs like tarragon, basil, mint or thyme. Summer fruits may go well with malty, floral Lowland whiskies such as redcurrant, while citrus fruits may be a good match with peaty Islay malts.

=== Foods ===
==== Seafood ====
Seafood dishes such as scallops go well with sweet, light, vanilla-tinged malts matured in bourbon casks. In general, smoky whiskies such as Islay malts go well with fish, and are often drank with oysters or smoked salmon.

==== Sushi ====
Sushi can be paired with a variety of whiskies, but Whisky Magazine found Talisker came out on top in testing. Ardbeg is also recommended, due to its salty, briny quality.

==== Red meat ====
A rich, sherried whisky like Auchentoshan Three Wood can be drunk with steak.

==== Charcuterie and cold meats ====
Ardbeg's saltiness complements ham and salami.

==== Indian food ====
Indian food, such as that cooked in a tandoor goes well with smoky whiskies.

==== Desserts ====
Sweeter whiskies naturally go better with desserts, such as Mortlach, a Speyside whisky. Benromach (from Speyside) goes well with chocolate. The Macallan (another Speyside malt) also goes well with some desserts. Lagavulin generally pairs well with plain dark chocolate.

== Whisky and cooking ==
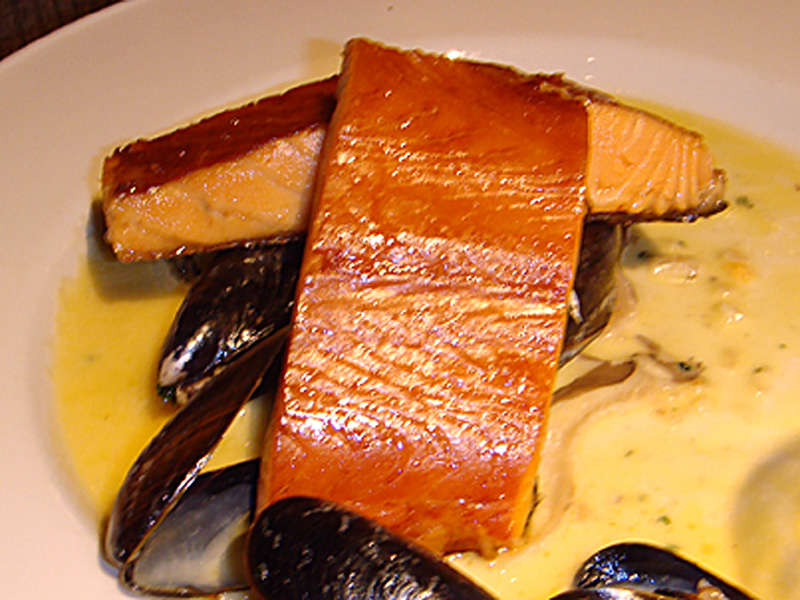
Salmon and shellfish in a whisky sauce

Whisky is ideal for cooking in stir fries or any Asian cooking and as a finishing to a dish, such as the haggis on Burns Night. Whisky can be used as a marinade and also in fruit salads and traditional fruit cake. Whisky can be used in the French cooking method flambé or can be used in place of flambé itself: Islay malt whisky can be used to glaze sauteed scollops or langoustines after they have been taken off the heat.

Single malt whiskys can be used in various dishes to enhance their flavor. Some sauces include whisky in their preparation.

Whisky sauce is a sauce in Scottish cooking, which has become popular globally. It is created by pouring an amount of whisky into a saucepan. It is then set alight, in order to make sure that the sauce is not too bitter. Double cream is added whilst stirring. The heat is then reduced so that the sauce can thicken and finally seasoning such as salt and pepper is added.

Chef Paul Rankin often uses whisky in his cooking.

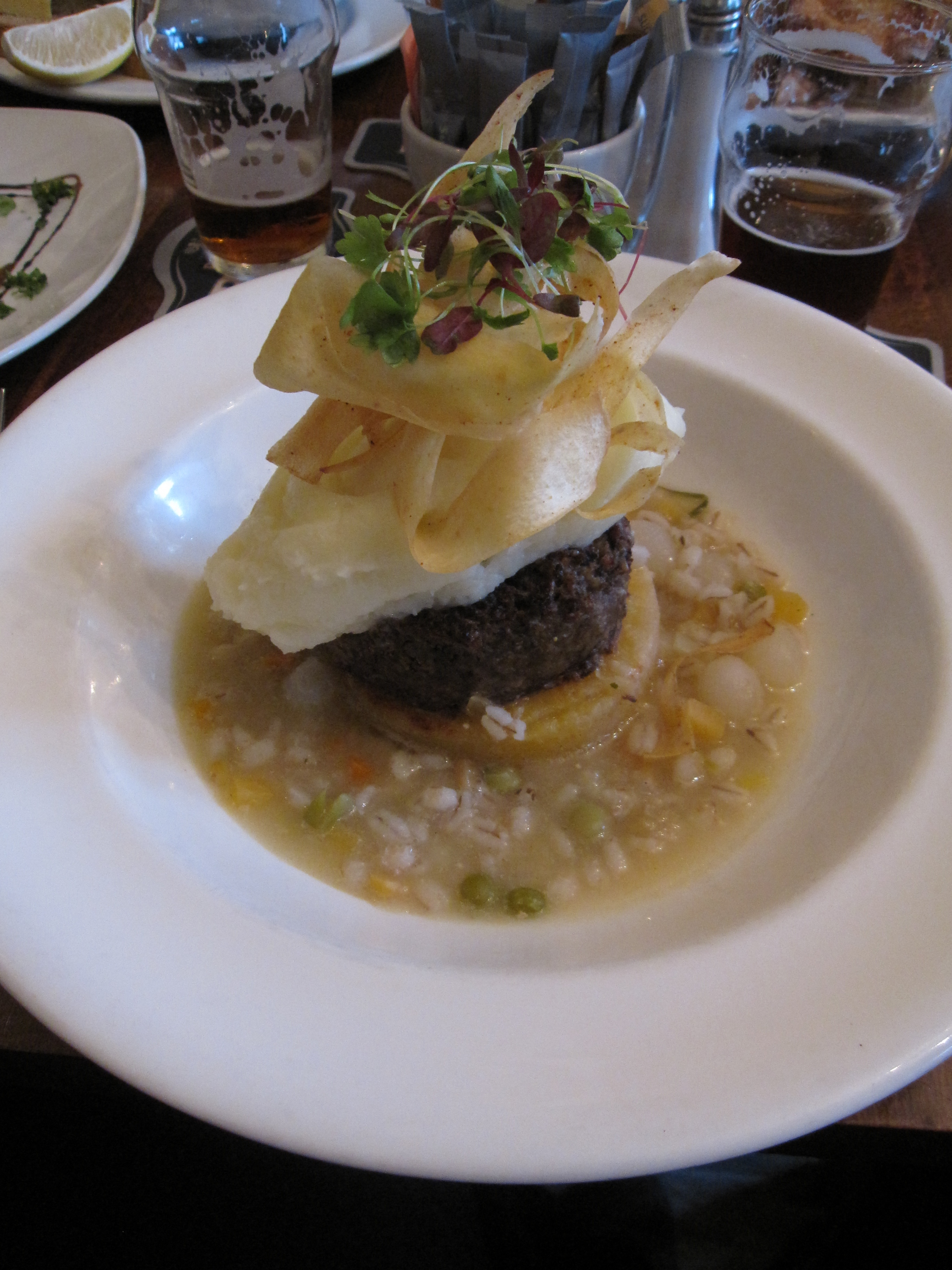
Haggis with neeps and tatties (mashed turnips and potatoes) in a whisky and barley broth. This dish was also served with a "wee dram" of Bell's Whisky on the side.

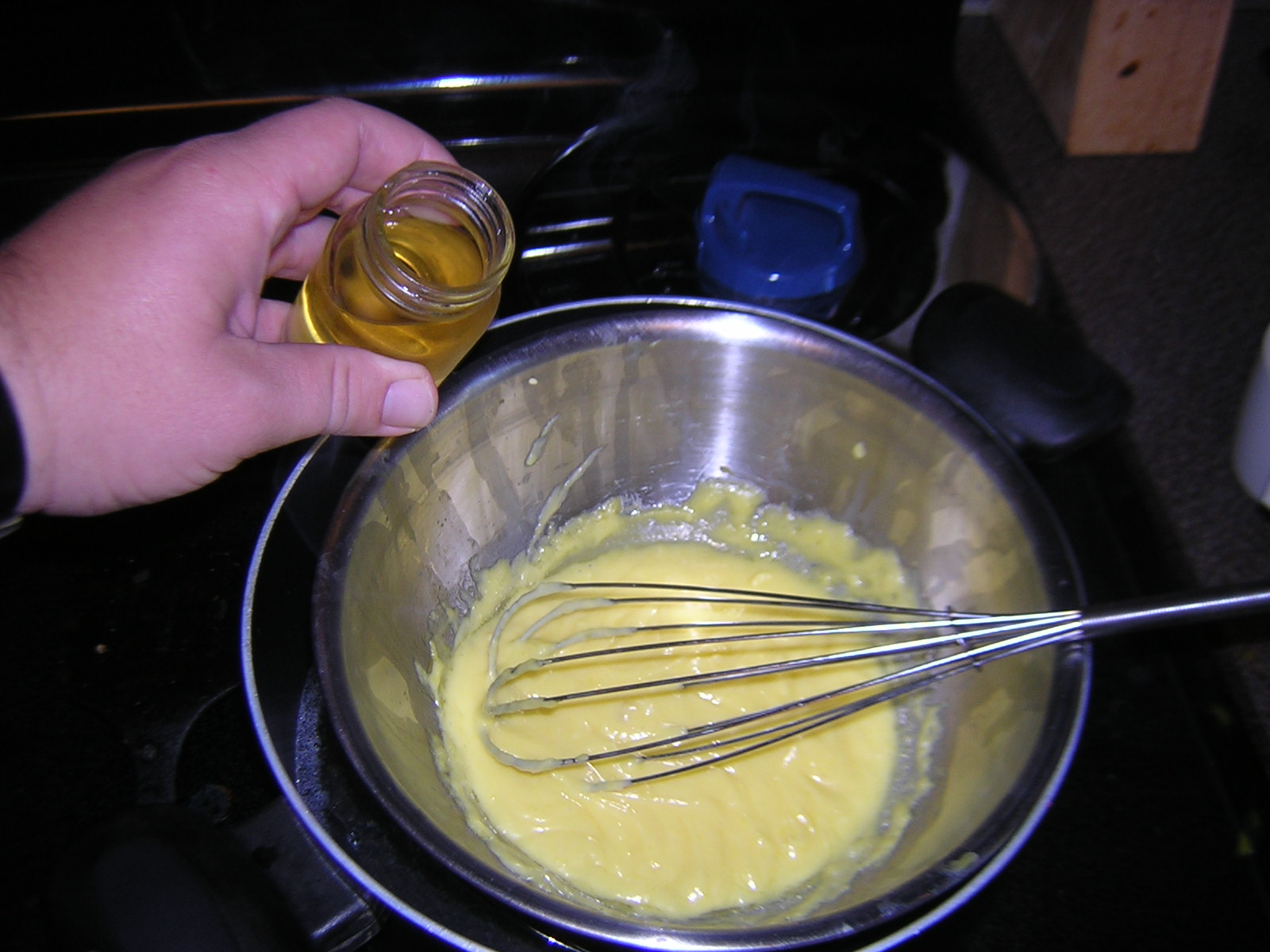
Hollandaise sauce prepared with whisky

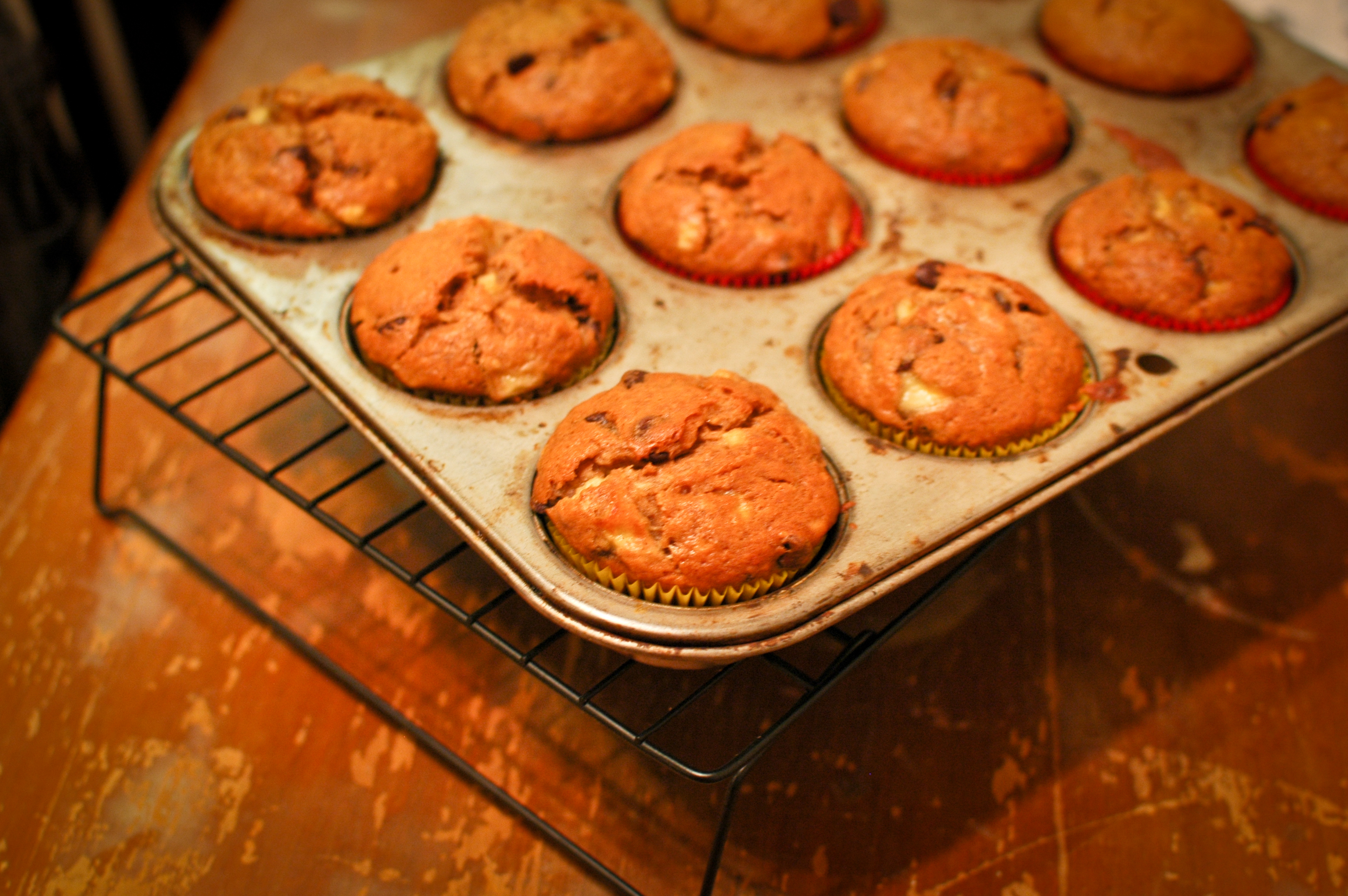
Chocolate chip muffins with banana and whisky

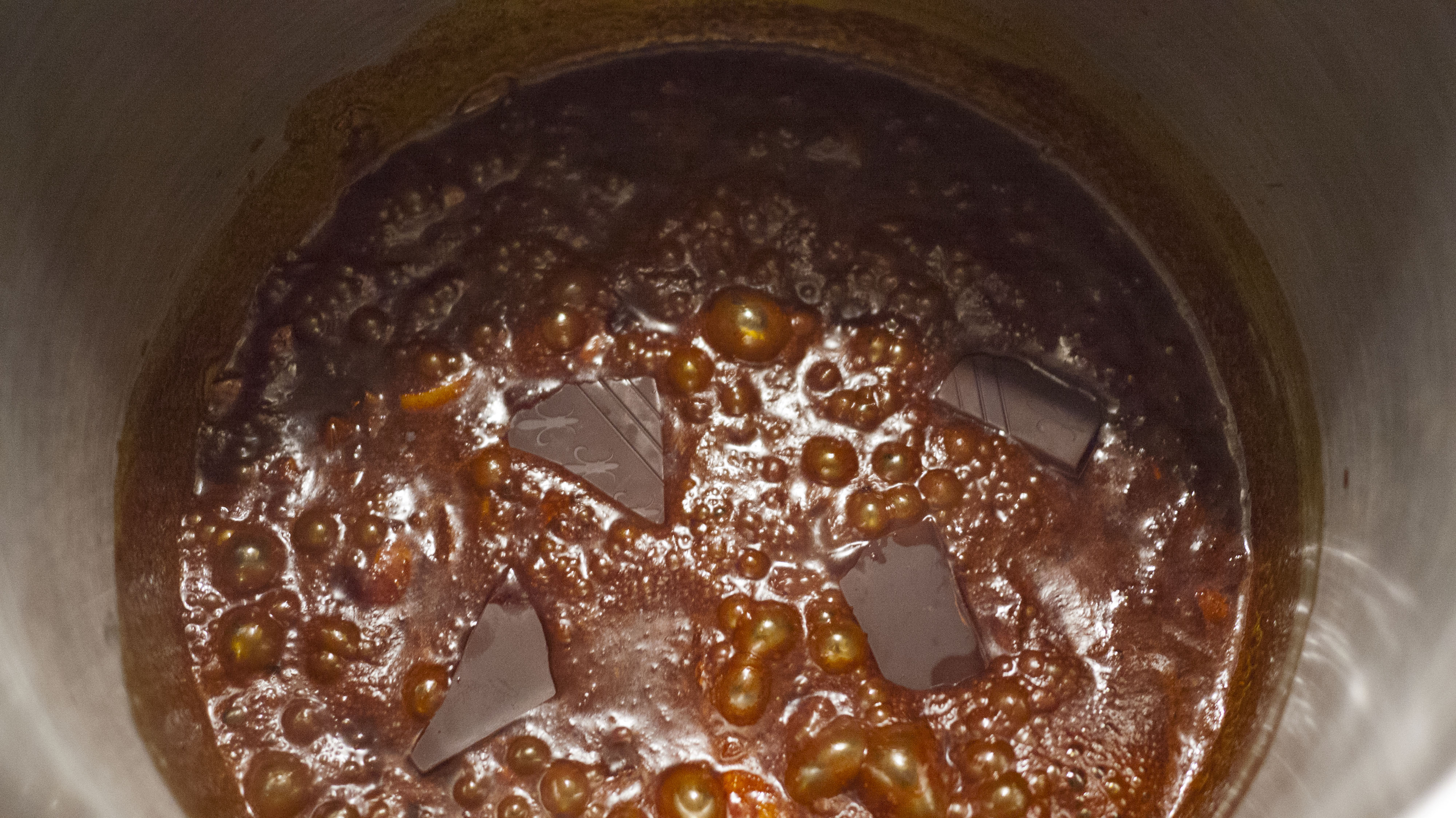
A sauce for chili stew prepared using whisky

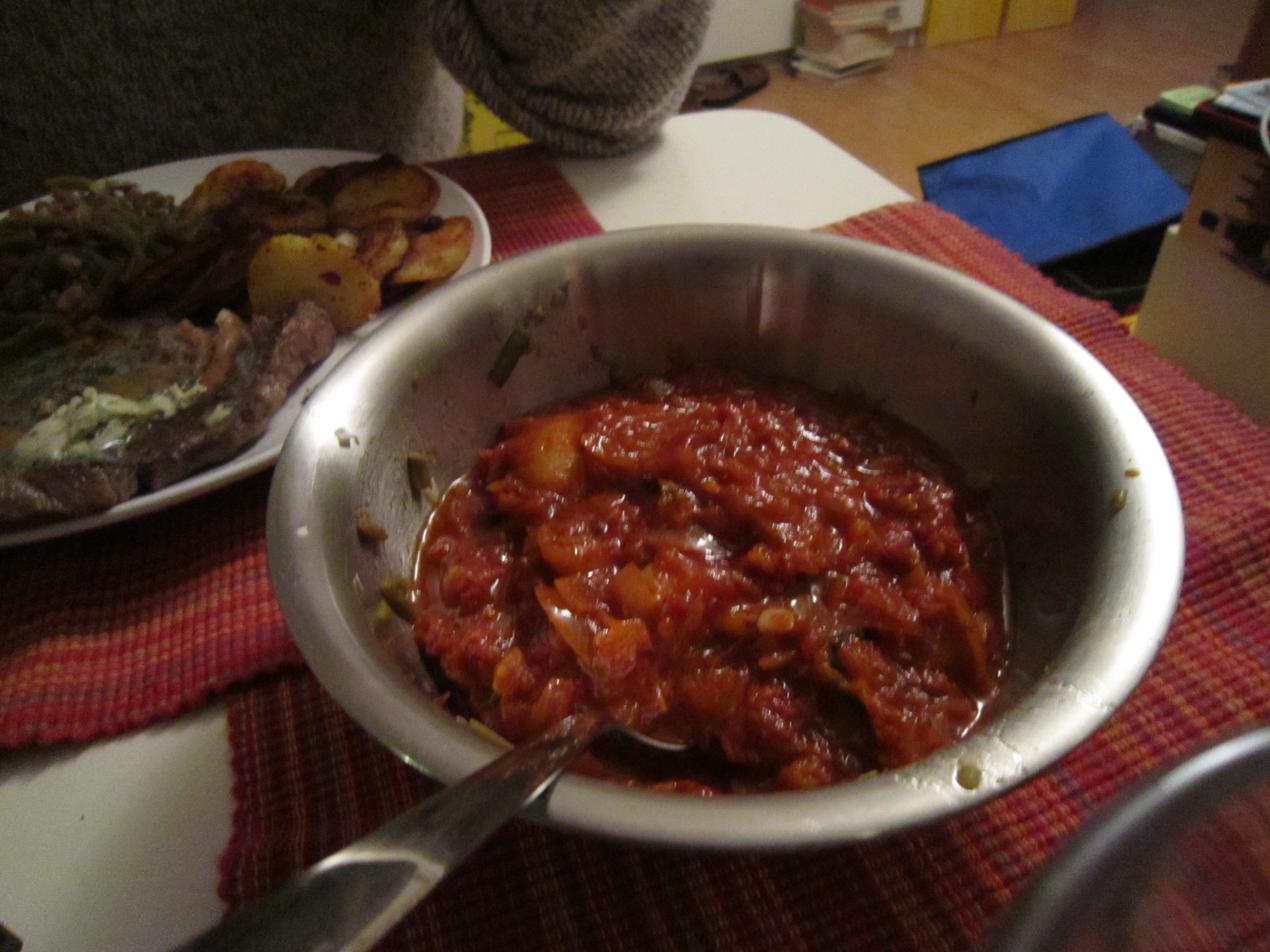
A steak sauce prepared with whisky and tomato

== See also ==
- Foodpairing
- Scottish cuisine
- Whisky

== Bibliography ==
- Maclean, Charles (2008). Whisky. Dorling Kindersley. ISBN 978-1-4053-2814-2.
- Jackson, Michael (2005). Whisky. Dorling Kindersley. ISBN 978-0-7513-4434-9.
