= Pangborn Sensory Science Symposium =

The Pangborn Sensory Science Symposium is a 4–5 days biannual academic conference focusing on sensory and consumer science, named after sensory pioneer Rose Marie Pangborn. Usually, the event has 800–1000 participants and takes place in a different country every uneven year, which is chosen two years in advance.

== Program ==
The main component of the conference consists of oral presentations given by the attendees. Keynote lectures, interactive workshops, and poster sessions complete the scientific program. Oral and poster presentations are selected by the scientific committee on the basis of submitted contributions, whereas keynote talks are generally by invitation.

== History ==
The first Pangborn Sensory Science Symposium was held in Järvenpää, Finland in 1993. Since its fifth edition (2003) it has been operated by Elsevier. The journal Food Quality and Preference is the official supporting publication of the symposia and usually publishes a special issue featuring selected contributions presented at each event.

== See also ==
- Food science
- Sensory science
- Food Quality and Preference
- Journal of Sensory Studies
