= Strawberry flavor =

Strawberry flavor may refer to:

- Ethyl methylphenylglycidate, an ingredient in most artificial strawberry flavorings
- Real strawberry flavor
