= C8H16O2 =

The molecular formula C_{8}H_{16}O_{2} may refer to:

- Butyl butyrate
- Caprylic acid
- Cyclohexanedimethanol
- Ethyl hexanoate
- 2-Ethylhexanoic acid
- Hexyl acetate
- Manzanate
- Methyl heptanoate
- Pentyl propanoate
- 2,2,4,4-Tetramethyl-1,3-cyclobutanediol
- Valproic acid
