= QDA =

QDA may refer to:

- Qualitative data analysis in qualitative research
- Quadratic discriminant analysis, a quadratic classifier
- Quantitative Descriptive Analysis, a behavioral sensory evaluation approach
- Quaker Digital Academy, an only Ohioan school for K-12 based in New Philadelphia
