= Dinescape =

Restaurant environment

In hospitality, a dinescape is a sensory analysis scale for assessing upscale restaurants based on aesthetics, ambience, lighting, service product, layout, and social factors. Dinescapes impact perceived food quality and re-patronage.

Dinecapes can have an outsized impact in casinos and cruises.
