= Flavor lexicon =

To develop and detail the sensory perception experienced from food

Flavor lexicons (American English) or flavour lexicons (Commonwealth English; see spelling differences) are used by professional taste testers to develop and detail the sensory perception experienced from food. The lexicon is a word bank developed by professional taste testers in order to identify an objective, nuanced and cross-cultural word bank for food.

== Background ==
Flavor is the sensory impression of food or other substances and is determined primarily by the chemical senses of taste and smell. Flavor is said to be 80 percent aroma, detected primarily through the retronasal smell mechanism. Sight, sound, and touch also impact flavor. The color of a food, sound as one bites into it, and texture are all factors that contribute to a person's perception of food. In addition, culture provides a context to food. All these experiences put together can affect a person's description of the food item.

Flavor lexicons seek to provide an objective word bank for food. This streamlines the variations created by the different language ascribed to food.

The development of flavor language allows tasters to pinpoint descriptions about the food they taste. There are three major descriptive analysis techniques used by professional taste testers: Flavor Profile Method (FPM); Quantitative Descriptive Analysis (QDA); and the Spectrum method.

== Taste testing ==
In developing a flavor lexicon, the tongue is a taster's instrument. A taster is trained to remain objective.

The first documented descriptive analysis technique, FPM, was first implemented in the 1950s. The structure of FPM is also the simplest of the three fewer panelists are employed with a minimum of four. Following a 60-hour training session, panel members work together to develop a consensus profile of the taste properties and their intensities on a four-point scale.

QDA features a sensory professional leading 8 to 12 prescreened individuals who make up the panel. The professional orders the evaluation of each descriptor. His or her panel defines the scales by judging the attributes. The significance of their findings is analyzed through statistical tests.

While panel sizes for the Spectrum Method are similar to that of QDA, tasters for the Spectrum Method require more screening for cognitive, descriptive, and sensory discrimination screening ability, interest, and availability.

== Development of taste characteristics ==
A requirement for a robust taste lexicon is for the characteristics to be discriminating and descriptive. For the trait to be descriptive, it must represent the range of variabilities an understanding of the food can present. Contrastly, it must also pinpoint what differentiates the food item from other foods. Thus, the descriptors must be clear, precise, and nonredundant. That is, though there are no restrictions on the number of terms belonging to a flavor lexicon, multiple terms should not describe one flavor and one term should not multiple flavors.

A number of associations can aid a taster in conceptualizing the food. First, panelists can link two words together such as "charcoal" and "burnt." This creates a heuristic so that foods with charcoal undertones are also linked with the word burnt. Oftentimes, multiple references are recommended to communicate a "concept" and can relay information better to certain panelists.

Cultural differences can also affect how food and flavor is perceived and described. Awareness can eliminate some confusion, but the use of flavor language can also eliminate some of the language/cultural barriers that may occur.

== Application ==
Flavor lexicons have proven to be especially important in wine-tasting. Professional wine tasters (sommeliers) use specific language to denote a wine's perceived flavors, aromas, and general characteristics as a way to sell the wine in the wide market.

Researcher MaryAnne Drake and team sought to standardize the language surrounding cheddar cheese. A list of 240 names belonging to cheddar cheese were collected, but using the Spectrum method, 27 terms were selected.

In 2016, Kansas State University researchers identified 110 aromas and tastes associated with the flavor of coffee. The coffee "dictionary" pinpoints exact dimensions of the flavor, though it remains a work in progress.
