= Hexyl acetate =

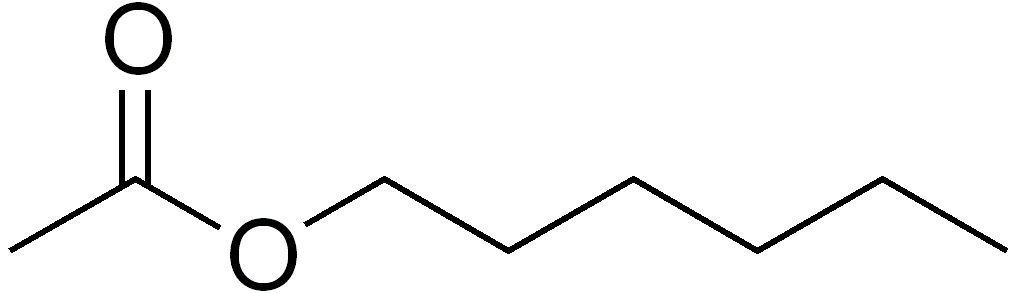

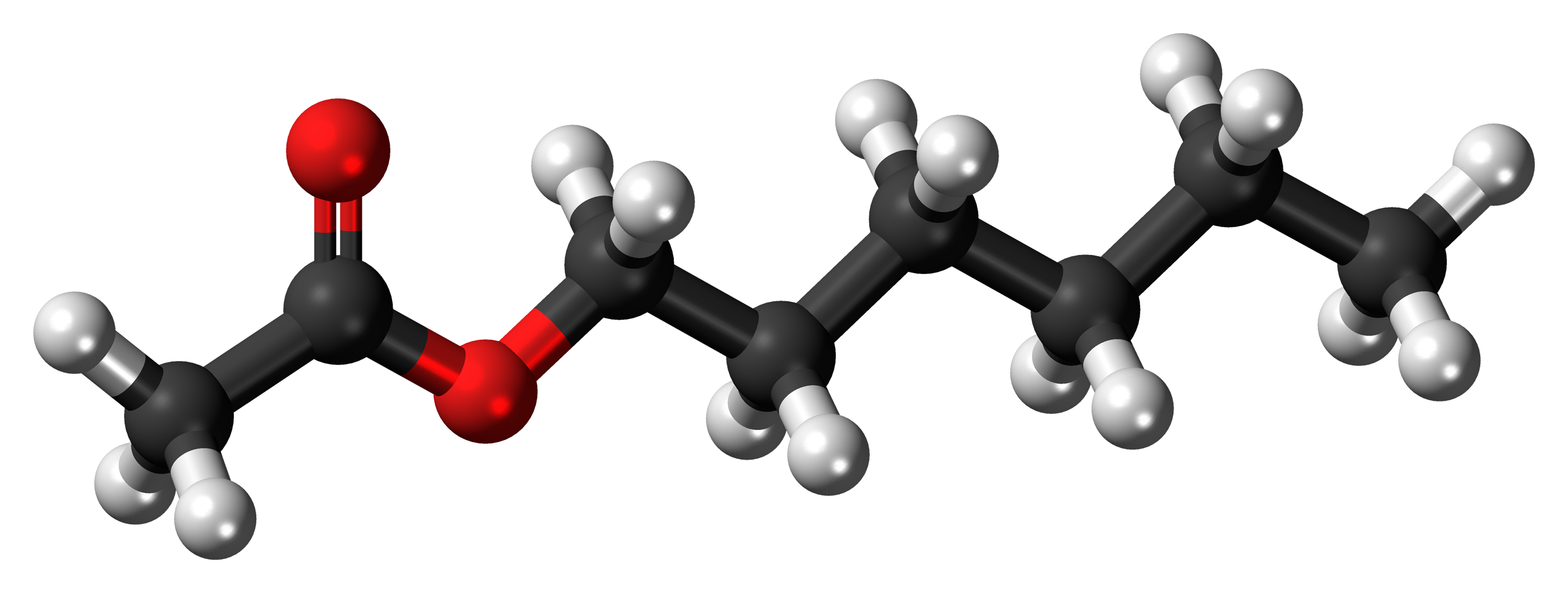

Names
- Preferred IUPAC name Hexyl acetate
- Other names n-Hexyl acetate; Capryl acetate; 1-Hexyl acetate; Hexyl ethanoate

Identifiers
CAS Number	142-92-7
3D model (JSmol)	Interactive image
ChEBI	CHEBI:87510
ChemSpider	8568
ECHA InfoCard	100.005.066
EC Number	205-572-7
PubChem CID	8908
UNII	7U7KU3MWT0
CompTox Dashboard (EPA)	DTXSID6022006
- InChI: InChI=1S/C8H16O2/c1-3-4-5-6-7-10-8(2)9/h3-7H2,1-2H3 Key: AOGQPLXWSUTHQB-UHFFFAOYSA-N; InChI=1/C8H16O2/c1-3-4-5-6-7-10-8(2)9/h3-7H2,1-2H3 Key: AOGQPLXWSUTHQB-UHFFFAOYAT
- SMILES: O=C(OCCCCCC)C

Properties
Chemical formula	C_{8}H_{16}O_{2}
Molar mass	144.214 g·mol^{−1}
Appearance	Colorless liquid
Density	0.8673 g/cm^{3}
Melting point	−80 °C (−112 °F; 193 K)
Boiling point	171.5 °C (340.7 °F; 444.6 K)
Solubility in water	0.4 g/L (20 °C)

Hazards
Flash point	43 °C
- Except where otherwise noted, data are given for materials in their standard state (at 25 °C [77 °F], 100 kPa). verify (what is ?) Infobox references

Hexyl acetate is an ester with the molecular formula C_{8}H_{16}O_{2}. It is mainly used as a solvent for resins, polymers, fats and oils. It is also used as a paint additive to improve its dispersion on a surface.

Hexyl acetate is also used as a flavoring because of its fruity odor, and it is naturally present in many fruits (such as apples and plums) as well as alcoholic beverages.
