= Journal of Texture Studies =

- Discipline: Food Science
- Language: English
- Edited by: Christopher R. Daubert, Jianshe Chen, Leif Lundin

Publication details
- History: 1969–present
- Publisher: Wiley-Blackwell
- Frequency: Bimonthly
- Impact factor: 0.821 (2011)

Standard abbreviations
- ISO 4: J. Texture Stud.

Indexing
- CODEN: JTXSBU
- ISSN: 0022-4901 (print); 1745-4603 (web)
- LCCN: 78015758
- OCLC no.: 01800057

Links
- Journal homepage; Online access; Online archive

The Journal of Texture Studies is a peer-reviewed scientific journal that covers research on the texture and sensory perception of food and other consumer products. In 2011 the journal redefined its scope to better reflect the broadening and increasingly interdisciplinary nature of texture and sensory perception research. The journal was established in 1969 and is published by Wiley-Blackwell.
