= Just-About-Right scale =

Sensory evaluation tool

The Just-About-Right scale (JAR scale), is a sensory evaluation tool used to measure the intensity of a particular attribute or characteristic of a product or service. The JAR scale typically consists of 5 levels ranging from "Much too little" to "Much too much."

The JAR scale focuses on specific attributes of a product such as sweetness, saltiness, texture, etc., or service such as expediency, cost, etc.

The JAR scale is criticized for measuring attribute intensity and acceptability simultaneously.

Just-About-Right Scale
Score	Interpretation
1	Much too little
2	Too little
3	Just about right
4	Too much
5	Much too much

== See also ==
- Hedonic scale
