= Weighted network =

Network where the ties among nodes have weights assigned to them

A weighted network is a network where the ties among nodes have weights assigned to them. A network is a system whose elements are somehow connected. The elements of a system are represented as nodes (also known as actors or vertices) and the connections among interacting elements are known as ties, edges, arcs, or links. The nodes might be neurons, individuals, groups, organisations, airports, or even countries, whereas ties can take the form of friendship, communication, collaboration, alliance, flow, or trade, to name a few.

In a number of real-world networks, not all ties in a network have the same capacity. In fact, ties are often associated with weights that differentiate them in terms of their strength, intensity, or capacity On the one hand, Mark Granovetter (1973) argued that the strength of social relationships in social networks is a function of their duration, emotional intensity, intimacy, and exchange of services. On the other, for non-social networks, weights often refer to the function performed by ties, e.g., the carbon flow (mg/m^{2}/day) between species in food webs, the number of synapses and gap junctions in neural networks, or the amount of traffic flowing along connections in transportation networks.

Example of a weighted network (weights can also be visualized by giving edges different widths)

By recording the strength of ties, a weighted network can be created (also known as a valued network).

Weighted networks are also widely used in genomic and systems biologic applications. For example, weighted gene co-expression network analysis (WGCNA) is often used for constructing a weighted network among genes (or gene products) based on gene expression (e.g. microarray) data. More generally, weighted correlation networks can be defined by soft-thresholding the pairwise correlations among variables (e.g. gene measurements).

== Measures for weighted networks ==
Although weighted networks are more difficult to analyse than if ties were simply present or absent, a number of network measures has been proposed for weighted networks:

- Node strength: The sum of weights attached to ties belonging to a node
- Closeness: Redefined by using Dijkstra's distance algorithm
- Betweenness: Redefined by using Dijkstra's distance algorithm
- The clustering coefficient (global): Redefined by using a triplet value
- The clustering coefficient (local): Redefined by using a triplet value or using an algebraic formula

A theoretical advantage of weighted networks is that they allow one to derive relationships among different network measures (also known as network concepts, statistics or indices). For example, Dong and Horvath (2007) show that simple relationships among network measures can be derived in clusters of nodes (modules) in weighted networks. For weighted correlation networks, one can use the angular interpretation of correlations to provide a geometric interpretation of network theoretic concepts and to derive unexpected relationships among them Horvath and Dong (2008)

== Intrinsically dense weighted networks ==
In network theory, intrinsically dense weighted networks represent a distinctive class of complex structures characterized by a near-completeness of links and associated weights, transcending the conventional constraints of sparser network configurations. Unlike sparse networks where the absence of links typically indicate lack of interaction, intrinsically dense networks exhibit a comprehensive interconnection among nodes, where each node is intricately linked to all others. Such systems do not have obvious natural limits for a node to have connection with any or all of the other nodes.

The term "intrinsically dense" emphasizes that edges within these networks may not solely represent positive relationships but can encompass randomness or even negative associations based on their respective weights. For instance, in scenarios where edge weights denote similarity between nodes, lower weights don't just signify a lack of similarity but may connote dissimilarity or negative underlying links. The study by Gursoy & Badur (2021) introduced methods to extract meaningful and sparse signed backbones from these networks, showcasing their significance in preserving the intricate structures inherent in intrinsically dense weighted networks across various domains including certain migration, voting, human contact, and species cohabitation networks. This distinctive network paradigm expands the understanding of complex systems observed in natural, social, and technological domains, offering insights into nuanced interactions and relationships within these densely interconnected networks.

== Software for analysing weighted networks ==
There are a number of software packages that can analyse weighted networks; see social network analysis software. Among these are the proprietary software UCINET and the open-source package tnet.

The WGCNA R package implements functions for constructing and analyzing weighted networks in particular weighted correlation networks.

== See also ==
- Disparity filter algorithm of weighted network
