= European Sensory Network =

International association of leading academic and research institutions

The European Sensory Network (ESN) is an international association of leading academic and research institutions in the field of sensory and consumer sciences. ESN members share their knowledge and expertise and work towards standard methodologies. The network was founded in 1989 to meet the challenge of the rapidly developing science of sensory analysis.

== Aims ==
The aims of the European Sensory Network are:

- to further the development and application of sensory science in Europe
- to improve sensory and consumer testing methodology for the benefit of the European food and non-food industry, e.g. by ensuring rapid feedback on research results of practical relevance to the industry
- to promote the application of sensory analysis in the industry; e.g. by in-house training and seminars

== Activities ==
ESN activities cover the following areas:

- Internal meetings to exchange experiences, to raise and discuss methodological questions, and to create new concepts and plans for co-operative research
- Information/Education: since its foundation ESN has regularly organised international seminars and conferences for industry participants in various countries.
- Method development and testing: new methods have been developed, internationally tested and compared
- Collaborative research: sensory and consumer studies on an international scale; publication of results in international reviews

A focus of ESN activities is on cross-border studies. ESN offers numerous cross-border links between sensory scientists and industrial partners. Through the network the members provide international contacts for industry regarding sensory analysis and consumer studies.

== Studies ==
Some examples:

- Proficiency Testing in Sensory Analysis: within the frame of the EU-funded project "ProfiSens", ESN has contributed to the development of international guidelines on how to evaluate panel performance and on how to monitor the consistency and comparability of test data in sensory laboratories.
- Calibration methods: ESN members took part in the EU-funded project "Calibsensory", which developed reference samples and calibration procedures for sensory testing of food contact materials (paper and board).
- By its participation in the EU study "Healthy aging" (HealthSense), ESN members have contributed to new findings on how changes in sensory physiology, sensory psychology and socio-cognitive factors influence food choice in old age.
- In the EU-project "Healthy Lifestyle in Europe by Nutrition in Adolescence" (HELENA), ESN members have compared eating habits of young people in five different European countries and identified barriers to healthy eating. They are involved in the development of new appealing healthy foods for young European consumers.
