= M. Ángeles Serrano =

Spanish physicist and network scientist

Maria Ángeles (Mariangeles) Serrano Moral is a Spanish network scientist and condensed-matter physicist. She is an ICREA Research Professor in the Department of Condensed Matter Physics of the University of Barcelona.

== Education and career ==
Serrano received a bachelor's degree in physics from the University of Barcelona in 1994. She continued at the university for a Ph.D. in theoretical physics in 1999, and a master's degree in mathematical finance in 2000. Her doctoral dissertation, The motion sensing problem in spherical gravitational wave detectors, concerned gravitational-wave astronomy and was supervised by J. Alberto Lobo Gutiérrez.

While working towards her doctorate, she also taught at a secondary school in Barcelona, and after completing her doctorate, she worked for four years as an information technology consultant and investment manager. She returned to academia in 2004 for a series of postdoctoral research positions at the University of Barcelona, Indiana University in the US, Institute for Scientific Interchange in Italy, École Polytechnique Fédérale de Lausanne in Switzerland, and the Institute for Cross-Disciplinary Physics and Complex Systems at the University of the Balearic Islands in Mallorca. She returned to the University of Barcelona in 2009 as a Ramón y Cajal Research Associate, and in 2015 became ICREA Research Professor and associate professor at the University of Barcelona.

== Recognition ==
Serrano was named as a Fellow of the American Physical Society (APS) in 2024, after a nomination from the APS Topical Group on Statistical and Nonlinear Physics, "for seminal contributions to the physics of complex networks, in particular the foundations of network geometry and advances in the analysis and modeling of weighted networks".
