= Whisky sauce =

Scottish whisky-based sauce

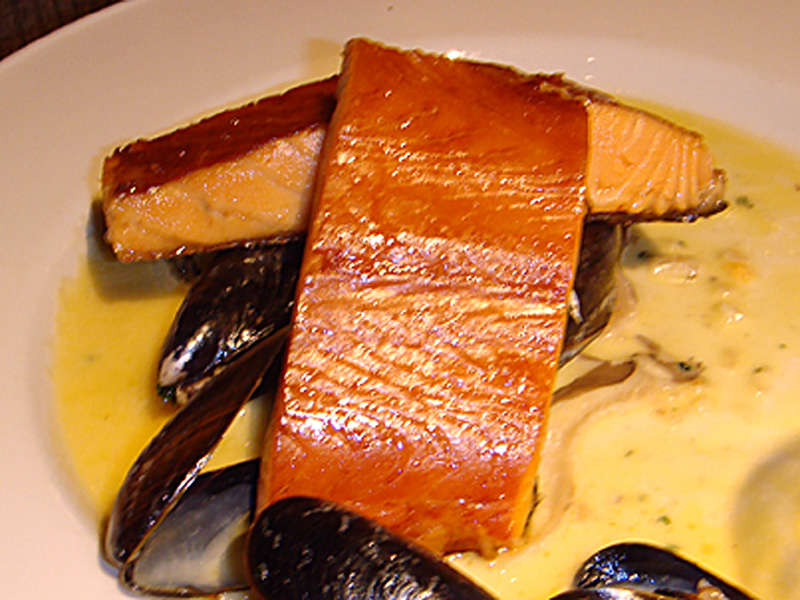
- Kiln-roasted salmon char-grilled with a shellfish, mushroom and whisky sauce
- Type: Sauce
- Place of origin: Scotland
- Main ingredients: Whisky, cream, seasoning

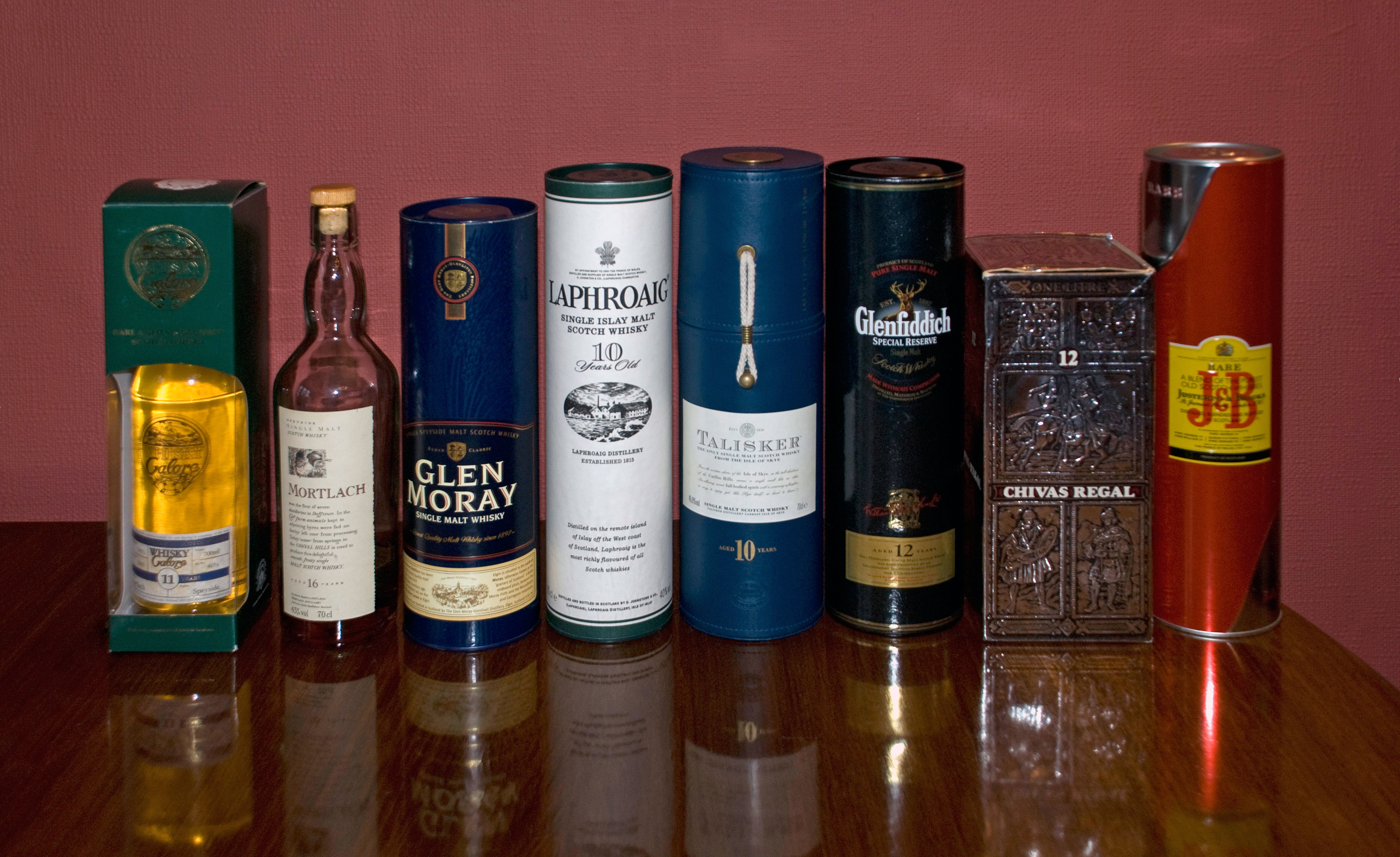
Whisky forms the basis of whisky sauce

Whisky sauce is a sauce in Scottish cooking, which has become popular globally. It is created by pouring an amount of whisky into a saucepan. It is then set alight, in order to make sure that the sauce is not too bitter. Double cream is added whilst stirring. The heat is then reduced so that the sauce can thicken and finally seasoning such as salt and pepper is added. Despite the fact that various types of alcohol have been used to make sauces for centuries, the lack of documentation of whisky sauce would seem to indicate that it is a relatively modern invention. However the documentation of whisky in savoury cooking goes back to at least Victorian times, where its use in meals is documented in Isabella Beeton's famous cookery book Mrs Beeton's Book of Household Management.

More recently, whisky sauce and barbeque sauces have been combined, in order to create whisky barbeque sauces such as those by Jim Beam and Jack Daniel's. Due to the distinctly Scottish nature of the sauce, recipes including whisky sauce have been popularised as dishes to be eaten on Burns supper along with the traditional main course of haggis.

== See also ==
- List of sauces
