= Food pairing =

Combination of foods

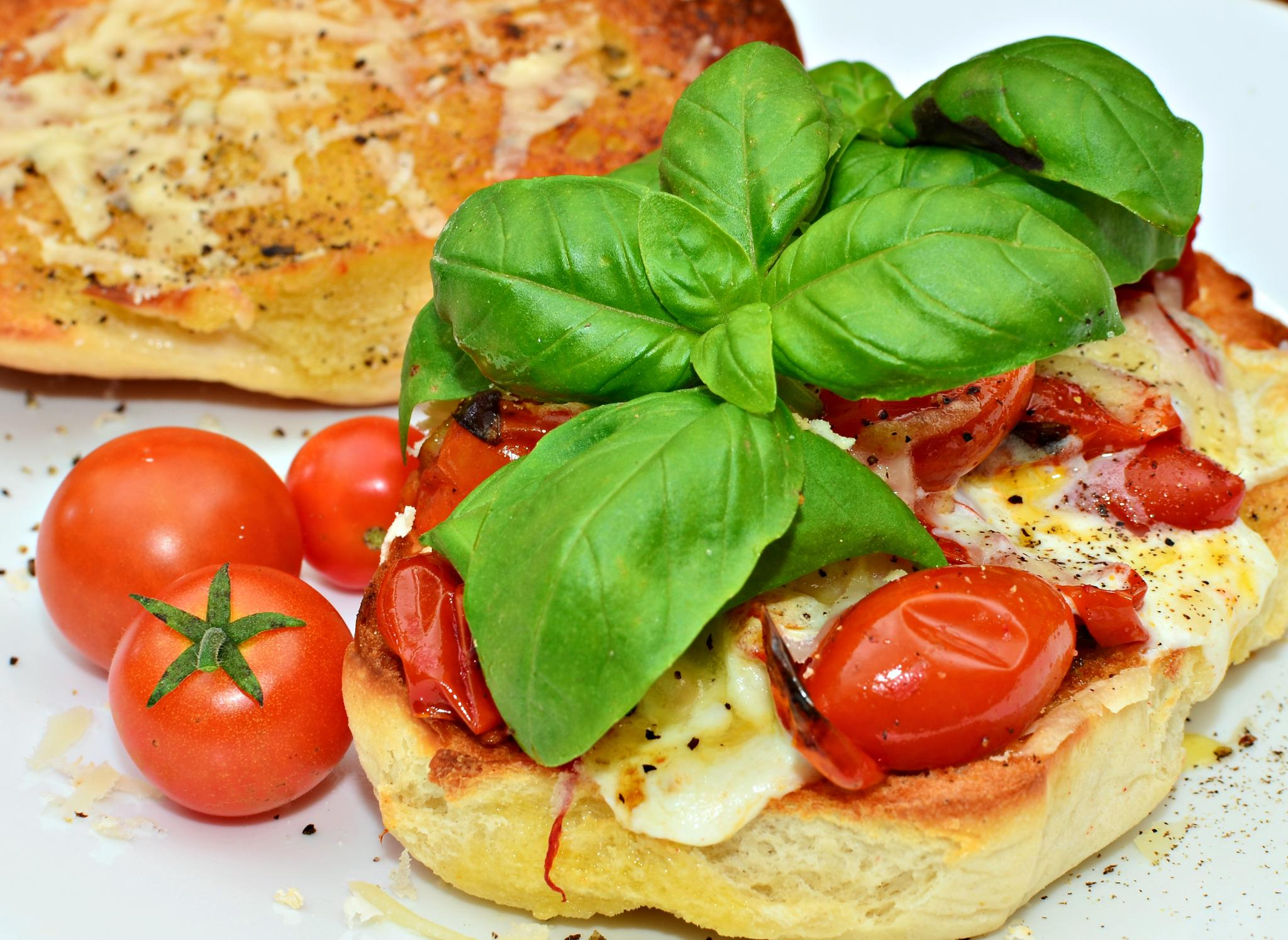
Tomato and basil are a common flavor pairing in some countries

Food pairing (or flavor pairing or food combination) is a method of identifying which foods go well together from a flavor standpoint, often based on individual tastes, popularity, availability of ingredients, and traditional cultural practices.

From a food science perspective, food pairing was an idea popular during the early 2000s that foods that share key chemical compounds or flavor components taste good together. This has since been debunked.

== Examples ==
Pairings where the flavors of two foods specifically complement one another include:

- Bacon and cabbage
- Chocolate milk
- Duck à l'orange
- Ham and eggs
- Liver and onions
- Peanut butter and jelly
- Pork chops and applesauce

== Food science ==
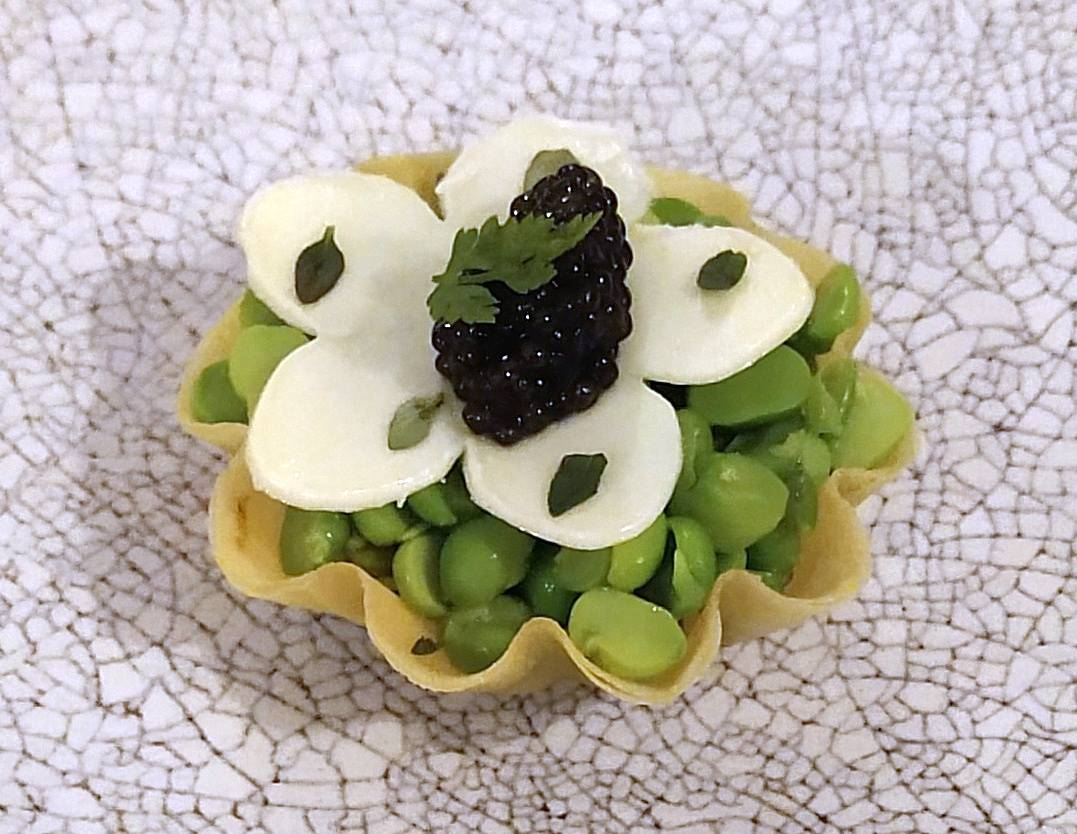
A pea tart topped with caviar and white chocolate

Experimenting with salty ingredients and chocolate around the year 2000, chef Heston Blumenthal concluded that caviar and white chocolate were a perfect match. To find out why, he contacted a flavor scientist at Firmenich, the flavor manufacturer. By comparing the flavor analysis of both foods, they found that caviar and white chocolate had major flavor components in common. Based on this, the idea of "food pairing" was born, that tasty food combinations could be created by looking for shared chemicals. Early combinations, including chocolate and blue cheese, and pork liver and jasmine received acclaim and media attention. However, systematic analyses performed during the 2010s found the technique could not predict what pairings would be considered good.

== See also ==
- Flavor threshold
- Food craving
- Food combining – Pseudoscientific view of meal composition
- Hyperpalatable food
- Ingredient-flavor network
- Molecular gastronomy
- Molecular mixology
- The Flavour Thesaurus
- Whisky with food
- Wine and food matching
