= Manzanate =

Ethyl 2-methylpentanoate
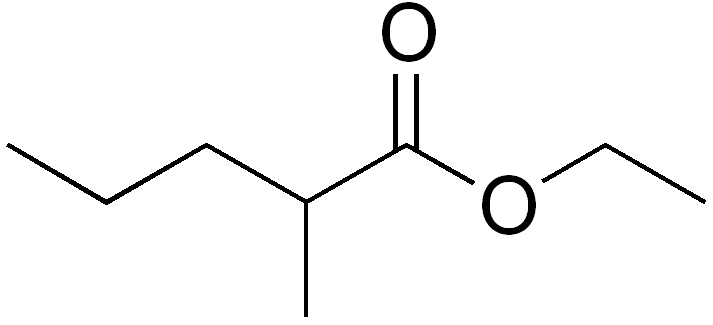

Names
- IUPAC name Ethyl 2-methylpentanoate
- Other names Ethyl α-methylvalerate; Melon valerate

Identifiers
CAS Number	39255-32-8
3D model (JSmol)	Interactive image
ChemSpider	56627
ECHA InfoCard	100.049.422
EC Number	254-384-1
PubChem CID	62902
UNII	405SN8638D
CompTox Dashboard (EPA)	DTXSID7047198
- InChI: InChI=1S/C8H16O2/c1-4-6-7(3)8(9)10-5-2/h7H,4-6H2,1-3H3 Key: HZPKNSYIDSNZKW-UHFFFAOYSA-N; InChI=1/C8H16O2/c1-4-6-7(3)8(9)10-5-2/h7H,4-6H2,1-3H3 Key: HZPKNSYIDSNZKW-UHFFFAOYAS
- SMILES: CCCC(C)C(=O)OCC

Properties
Chemical formula	C_{8}H_{16}O_{2}
Molar mass	144.21 g/mol
- Except where otherwise noted, data are given for materials in their standard state (at 25 °C [77 °F], 100 kPa). verify (what is ?) Infobox references

Manzanate is a flavor ingredient which has a fruity apple smell and with aspects of cider and sweet pineapple.
