= Ethyl methylphenylglycidate =

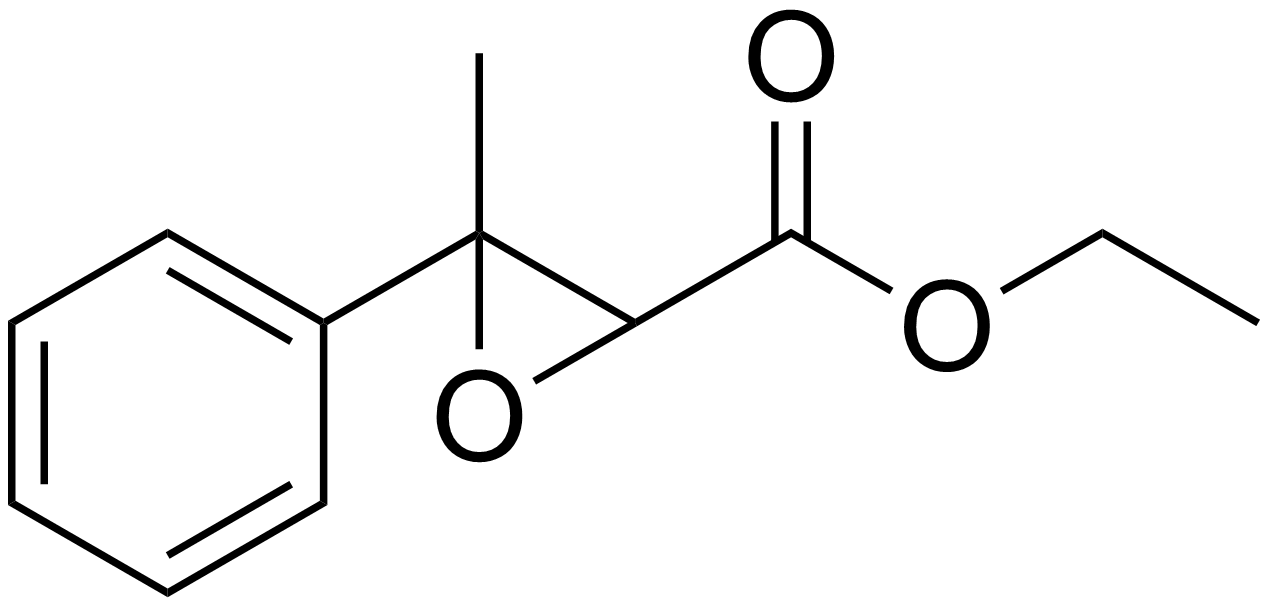
- Chemical structure of ethyl methylphenylglycidate

Names
- IUPAC name Ethyl 3-methyl-3-phenyloxirane-2-carboxylate
- Other names Ethyl methylphenylglycidate Strawberry aldehyde Aldehyde C-16

Identifiers
| CAS Number | 77-83-8 |
| 3D model (JSmol) | Interactive image |
| ChemSpider | 6255 |
| ECHA InfoCard | 100.000.966 |
| PubChem CID | 6501 |
| UNII | UD51D5KR4A |
| CompTox Dashboard (EPA) | DTXSID8020591 |
- InChI: InChI=1S/C12H14O3/c1-3-14-11(13)10-12(2,15-10)9-7-5-4-6-8-9/h4-8,10H,3H2,1-2H3 Key: LQKRYVGRPXFFAV-UHFFFAOYSA-N
- SMILES: CC(C2C(OCC)=O)(O2)C1=CC=CC=C1

Properties
| Chemical formula | C_{12}H_{14}O_{3} |
| Molar mass | 206.241 g·mol^{−1} |
| Appearance | Colorless liquid |
| Density | 1.09-1.10 g/cm^{3} |
| Melting point | 7 to 8 °C (45 to 46 °F; 280 to 281 K) |
| Boiling point | 272 to 275 °C (522 to 527 °F; 545 to 548 K) |
| Solubility in water | Insoluble |
- Except where otherwise noted, data are given for materials in their standard state (at 25 °C [77 °F], 100 kPa). verify (what is ?) Infobox references

Ethyl methylphenylglycidate, commonly known as strawberry aldehyde, is an organic compound used in the flavor industry in artificial fruit flavors, particularly strawberry.

== Uses ==
Because of its pleasant taste and aroma, ethyl methylphenylglycidate finds use in the fragrance industry, in artificial flavors, and in cosmetics. Its end applications include perfumes, soaps, beauty care products, detergents, pharmaceuticals, baked goods, candies, ice cream, and others. Its aroma is described as "sweet, fruity, strawberry, floral, honey, fatty".

== Chemistry ==
Ethyl methylphenylglycidate contains ester and epoxide functional groups; however, despite its common name, it lacks the presence of an aldehyde group. It is a colorless liquid that is insoluble in water.

Ethyl methylphenylglycidate is usually prepared by the condensation of acetophenone and the ethyl ester of monochloroacetic acid in the presence of a base, in a reaction known as the Darzens condensation.

Ethyl methylphenylglycidate is stable under neutral conditions, but may decompose in alkaline environments.

== Safety ==
Long-term, high-dose studies in rats have demonstrated that ethyl methylphenylglycidate has no significant adverse health effects and is not carcinogenic. The US Food and Drug Administration has classified ethyl methylphenylglycidate as generally recognized as safe (GRAS).

== See also ==
- List of strawberry topics
