= Flavoring =

Food additive used to change its aroma or taste

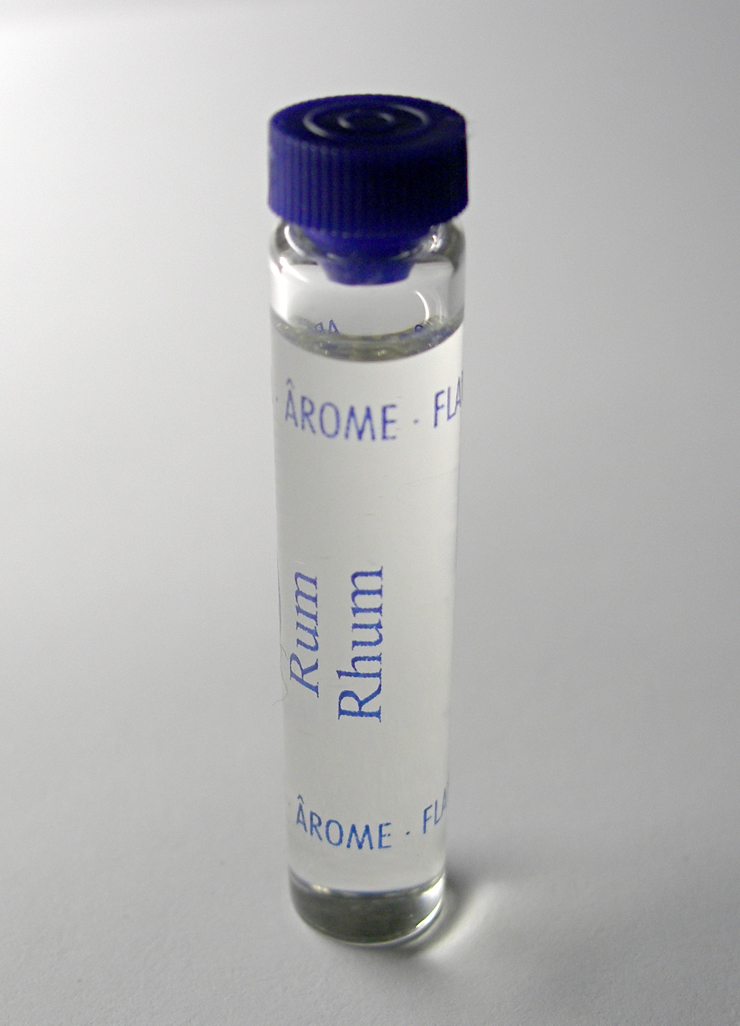
A flavoring

A flavoring (or flavouring), (Note: See spelling differences: American and British English spelling differences) also known as flavor (or flavour) or flavorant, is a food additive that is used to improve the taste or smell of food. It changes the perceptual impression of food as determined primarily by the chemoreceptors of the gustatory and olfactory systems. Along with additives, other components, like sugars, determine the taste of food.

A flavoring is defined as a substance that gives another substance taste, altering the characteristics of the solute, causing it to become sweet, sour, tangy, etc. Although the term, in common language, denotes the combined chemical sensations of taste and smell, the same term is used in the fragrance and flavors industry to refer to edible chemicals and extracts that alter the flavor of food and food products through the sense of smell.

Owing to the high cost, or unavailability, of natural flavor extracts, most commercial flavorings are "nature-identical", which means that they are the chemical equivalent of natural flavors, but chemically synthesized rather than having been extracted from source materials. Identification of components of natural foods, for example a raspberry, may be done using technology such as headspace techniques, so the flavorist can imitate the flavor by using a few of the same chemicals present. In the EU legislation, the term "natural-identical flavoring" does not exist. The legislation is specified on what is a "flavoring" and a "natural flavoring".

== Definition ==
A flavoring is a volatile additive that improves the taste or smell of food. They work primarily via the sense of smell. In legislation, substances that exclusively have a sweet, sour or salty taste are not considered flavorings. These usually include flavor enhancers, sweeteners, acidulants and salt substitutes.

There are different ways to divide flavorings. First by the way they are produced. A vanilla flavoring can for example be obtained naturally by extraction from vanilla seeds, or one can start with cheap chemicals and try to make a similar substance artificially (in this example vanillin). A nature-identical flavoring is chemically an exact copy of the original substance and can be either natural or artificial. Vanillin is neither obtained from the vanilla plant nor an exact copy of vanilla, but a synthesized nature-identical component of the vanilla aroma. Vanillin is not vanilla, but gives a food a vanilla aroma.

The second division is by the effect they have on smell (aroma) or taste of the food. The effect can be the aroma of a specific fruit, almond, butter, smoke from wood, or some fantasy flavor. The aroma of the flavoring may resemble that of the source, or imitate a particular unrelated food. It may for example be the extract from vanilla seeds and smell like vanilla, or it may be the extract of a potato and smell like a banana. Irrespective of the effect, the flavoring may be natural or artificial. It may for example be the natural tissue of an animal with the aroma of a citrus, or just a chemical that smells like a citrus.

== Division by production method ==
Flavorings can be divided into three principal types: "natural flavorings", "nature-identical flavorings", and "artificial flavorings". In the United States, they are traditionally divided into natural and artificial flavorings, where the latter includes nature-identical flavorings. In contrast, European legislation does not distinguish natural and nature-identical flavorings, while only the term "natural" is subject to some regulation.

=== Natural flavorings ===
The FDA defines a "natural flavor" as an "essential oil, oleoresin, essence or extractive, protein hydrolysate, distillate, or any product of roasting, heating or enzymolysis," derived from a plant and/or animal source.

Though the flavors themselves must come from natural sources, solvents and emulsifiers can be used to extract them without needing to be disclosed as ingredients. Other techniques to obtain natural flavorings include the use of enzymes and/or microorganisms.

Natural flavorings can also be produced by genetically modified organisms (GMOs) – not found in nature. Natural flavorings can be isolated on industrial scale, to be used as an additive.

=== Nature-identical flavorings ===
Nature-identical flavorings are human-made aroma compounds that are chemically identical to some substance that can be found in nature. They are synthesized from chemicals or isolated by means of chemical processes.

Because nature-identical flavorings can be produced at low costs, the food industry will argue that nature-identical and natural flavorings are exactly the same. They have the advantage to be chemically pure, without allergens that may be coupled with natural flavorings. On the other hand, they are missing the synergy of other substances present in their natural origin, so they may lack subtlety.

=== Artificial flavorings ===
Artificial flavorings are synthesized from chemical substances by humans and are not found in nature. Their sensory characteristics mostly resemble that of natural or nature-identical flavorings.

== Perception of flavorings ==
Aromas are the volatile components of the food. The aroma is determined by the aroma compounds it contains and the personal ability to detect them. While an aroma primarily acts through the olfactory system, it also affects the taste at the same time.

Along with additives, other components, like sugars, determine the taste of food. The trigeminal nerves, which detect chemical irritants in the mouth and throat, as well as temperature and texture, are also important to the overall perception of food.

== Mechanism ==
Flavors from food products are usually the result of a combination of natural flavors, which set up the basic smell profile of a food product, while artificial flavors modify the smell to accent it.

Unlike smelling, which occurs upon inhalation, the sensing of flavors in the mouth occurs in the exhalation phase of breathing and is perceived differently by an individual. In other words, the smell of food is different depending on whether one is smelling it before or after it has entered one's mouth.

== Taste ==
The taste of a food product is determined not only by the aromas present in the original material and added flavorings, but also by accompanying substances, like flavor enhancers, sweeteners, acidulants and salt substitutes. Polyols, like sorbitol and maltitol, are carriers in flavorings, but they themselves also have a sweet taste.

Even the color of food can affect one's experience of the taste significantly. In one study, adding more red color to a drink increased the perceived sweetness, with darker colored solutions being rated 2–10% better than lighter ones, though it had 1% less sucrose concentration. Food manufacturers exploit this phenomenon; for example, different colors of the U.S. product Froot Loops cereal and most brands of Gummy Bears often use the same flavorings.

=== Flavor enhancers ===
Flavor enhancers or taste enhancers, which are umami or "savory" compounds, are themselves not flavorings, but they intensify the taste of the food. They are largely based on amino acids and nucleotides. These are typically used as sodium or calcium salts. Umami flavorings recognized and approved by the European Union include:

Acid salts	Description
Glutamic acid salts	This amino acid's sodium salt, monosodium glutamate (MSG), is one of the most commonly used flavor enhancers in food processing. Mono- and diglutamate salts are also commonly used.
Glycine salts	Simple amino acid salts typically combined with glutamic acid as flavor enhancers
Guanylic acid (GMP) salts	Nucleotide salts typically combined with glutamic acid as flavor enhancers
Inosinic acid (IMP) salts	Nucleotide salts created from the breakdown of AMP. Due to high costs of production, typically combined with glutamic acid as flavor enhancers
5'-ribonucleotide salts	A blend of GMP and IMP salts ("I+G"), generally in the disodium ribonucleotides form; typically combined with amino acids flavor enhancers

== Regulations ==
=== In Europe ===
Under the EU legislation, substances which have exclusively a sweet, sour or salty taste are not considered flavorings (Article 2, Regulation (EC) No 1334/2008.

Also flavor enhancers are not considered flavorings under the EU legislation but additives (Point 14 of Annex I of Regulation (EC) No 1333/2008).

EU legislation defines several types of flavorings:

- flavoring substances (including "natural flavouring substances"):
- flavoring preparations (by definition always natural):
- thermal process flavorings
- smoke flavorings
- flavor precursors
- other flavorings

In the EU, Regulation (EC) No 1334/2008 on flavorings and certain food ingredients with flavoring properties for use in/on foods, i.e. the EU Flavouring Regulation, was adopted on 16 December 2008 and entered into force on 20 January 2009. It applies from 20 January 2011. Regulation (EC) No 1334/2008 lays down general requirements for safe use of flavorings and provides definitions for different types of flavorings. The Regulation sets out substances for which an evaluation and approval is required. The Union list of flavoring substances, approved for use in and on foods, was adopted on 1 October 2012 and was introduced in Annex I of this Regulation

==== In the UK ====
The UK followed the above EU legislation which remained in force until 31 December 2020. The European Union (Withdrawal) Act 2018 provided that from 1 January 2021, this directly applicable EU legislation was converted into UK law with minor corrections to enable it to operate effectively as UK law. These corrections were made by Statutory Instrument 2019 No. 860.

The UK Food industry, in collaboration with the flavoring industry, has developed guidance on what to consider when declaring a pictorial representation of a food ingredient on the label of a pre-packed product.

=== In the United States ===
In the United States, flavorings are regulated in Title 21 of the Code of Federal Regulations. They are divided into artificial and natural flavorings.

=== In Australia and New Zealand ===
In Australia and New Zealand regulation of flavorings is covered by the Australia New Zealand Food Standards Code of November 2000, entered into force in December 2002.

Natural flavorings are obtained from plant or animal raw materials, by physical, microbiological, or enzymatic processes. They can be either used in their natural state or processed for human consumption, but cannot contain any nature-identical or artificial flavoring substances.

Nature-identical flavorings are obtained by synthesis or isolated through chemical processes, which are chemically and organoleptically identical to flavoring substances naturally present in products intended for human consumption. They cannot contain any artificial flavoring substances.

Artificial flavorings are "flavouring substances not identified in a natural product intended for human consumption, whether or not the product is processed."

=== Regulations on natural flavoring ===
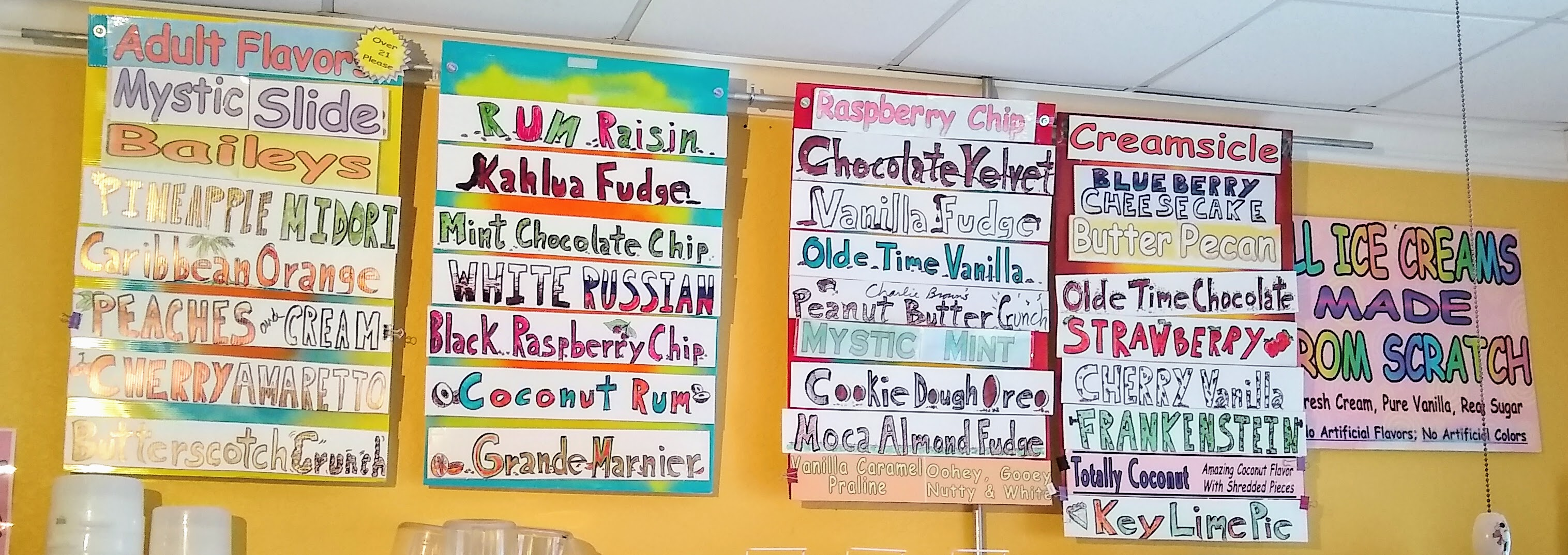
American ice cream shop using natural flavors

In the EU, in order to be labeled as natural flavoring substance, many conditions have to be fulfilled: "Natural flavouring substance" shall mean a flavoring substance obtained by appropriate physical, enzymatic or microbiological processes from material of vegetable, animal or microbiological origin either in the raw state or after processing for human consumption by one or more of the traditional food preparation processes listed in Annex II. Natural flavoring substances correspond to substances that are naturally present and have been identified in nature (Article 3).

More detailed information on the Production of Natural Flavouring Substances and (Natural) Flavouring Preparations can be found on the European Flavour Association (EFFA) Guidance Document.

UK Food Law defines a natural flavor as:

A flavouring substance (or flavouring substances) which is (or are) obtained, by physical, enzymatic, or microbiological processes, from material of vegetable or animal origin which material is either raw or has been subjected to a process normally used in preparing food for human consumption and to no process other than one normally so used

The U.S. Code of Federal Regulations describes a "natural flavoring" as:

The essential oil, oleoresin, essence, or extractive, protein hydrolysate, distillate, or any product of roasting, heating, or enzymolysis, which contains the flavoring constituents derived from a spice, fruit, or fruit juice, vegetable or vegetable juice, edible yeast, herb, bark, bud, root, leaf, or any other edible portions of a plant, meat, seafood, poultry, eggs, dairy products, or fermentation products thereof, whose primary function in food is flavoring rather than nutritional.

== Dietary restrictions ==
Food manufacturers are sometimes reluctant to inform consumers about the source and identity of flavor ingredients and whether they have been produced with the incorporation of substances such as animal byproducts. Some flavor ingredients, such as gelatin, are produced from animal products. Some, such as glycerin, can be derived from either animal or vegetable sources. And some extracts, such as vanilla, may contain alcohol. Many groups, such as Jews, Jains, Hindus, and Muslims, as well as vegans, follow dietary restrictions which disallow the use of animal byproducts and/or alcohol in certain contexts. In many Western countries, some consumers rely on a Jewish kosher pareve certification mark to indicate that natural flavorings used in a food product are free of meat and dairy (although they can still contain fish). The Vegan Society's Sunflower symbol (which is currently used by over 260 companies worldwide) can also be used to see which products do not use any animal ingredients (including flavorings and colorings).

Similarly, persons with known sensitivities or allergies to food products are advised to avoid foods that contain generic "natural flavors" or to first determine the source of the flavoring before consuming the food. Such flavors may be derived from a variety of source products that are themselves common allergens, such as dairy, soy, sesame, eggs, and nuts. In the EU, nevertheless, this information is available in the labeling. Regulation (EU) No. 1169/2011 on the provision of food information to consumers, states in article 9 that any ingredient or processing aid listed in Annex II (of the aforementioned Regulation) or derived from a substance or product listed in Annex II causing allergies or intolerances used in the manufacture or preparation of a food and still present in the finished product, even if in an altered form, must be included in the labeling.

== Flavor creation ==
Most artificial flavors are specific and often complex mixtures of singular naturally occurring flavor compounds combined to either imitate or enhance a natural flavor. These mixtures are formulated by flavorists to give a food product a unique flavor and to maintain flavor consistency between different product batches or after recipe changes. The list of known flavoring agents includes thousands of molecular compounds, and flavor chemists (flavorists) can often mix these together to produce many of the common flavors. Many flavorings consist of esters, which are often described as being sweet or fruity.

The compounds used to produce artificial flavors are almost identical to those that occur naturally. It has been suggested that artificial flavors may be safer to consume than natural flavors due to the standards of purity and mixture consistency that are enforced either by the company or by law. Natural flavors, in contrast, may contain impurities from their sources, while artificial flavors are typically more pure and are required to undergo more testing before being sold for consumption.

Food and beverage companies may require flavors for new products, product line extensions (e.g., low fat versions of existing products), or changes in formula or processing for existing products. In 2011, about US$10.6 billion were generated with the sale of flavors; the majority of the flavors used are consumed in ultra-processed food and convenience food.

The number of food smells is unbounded; a food's flavor, therefore, can be easily altered by changing its smell while keeping its taste similar. This is exemplified in artificially flavored jellies, soft drinks and candies, which, while made of bases with a similar taste, have dramatically different flavors due to the use of different scents or fragrances.

Most flavors represent a mixture of aroma compounds, the raw material that is produced by flavor companies. In rare cases, a single synthetic compound is used in pure form. Artificial vanilla flavors vanillin and ethylvanillin are a notable exception, as well as the artificial strawberry flavor (ethyl methylphenylglycidate). The ubiquitous "green apple" aroma is based on hexyl acetate.

Data-driven and artificial intelligence (AI) methods are increasingly being applied to flavor creation, including the identification of novel flavor molecules, prediction of their sensory properties, and computational design of flavor compounds.

Table of some fruity flavorings
Chemical	Odor
Manzanate	Apple
Diacetyl, acetylpropionyl, acetoin	Buttery
Isoamyl acetate	Banana
Benzaldehyde	Bitter almond, cherry
Cinnamaldehyde	Cinnamon
Ethyl propionate	Fruity
Methyl anthranilate	Grape
Limonene	Orange
γ-Decalactone	Peach
Ethyl decadienoate	Pear
Allyl hexanoate	Pineapple
Ethyl methylphenylglycidate	Strawberry
Ethyl maltol	Caramelized sugar, cotton candy
2,4-Dithiapentane	Truffle
Ethylvanillin	Vanilla
Methyl salicylate	Wintergreen

Some flavors are relatively multifaceted. For example, the basic aroma of cooked meat is formed by a combination of Maillard reaction, lipid peroxidation, and degradation of sulfur-containing compounds, such as thiamine and cysteine. With this understanding, an artificial chicken flavor can be made from ingredients as simple as glucose, salt, cysteine, and arachidonic acid: when heated in a water solution they undergo these three reactions to produce the desired flavor. (Such a flavor produced during the preparation process from precursor compounds is called a "process flavor"). Small tweaks to the mixture can instead produce a beef flavor. This kind of basic meat flavoring has been known since the 1970s. Of course, these four chemicals only mimic a small number of possible reactions out of the many reactions possible among the complex flavor precursor chemicals found in meat. For a more realistically complex aroma, natural feedstocks such as yeast extract, hydrolyzed vegetable protein, and spices can be used to expand the number of possible reactions. They also contribute peptides, free amino acids, and nucleic acid metabolites that all play a role in the natural taste of meat.

== Determination ==
Few standards are available or being prepared for sensory analysis of flavors. In chemical analysis of flavors, solid phase extraction, solid phase microextraction, and headspace gas chromatography are applied to extract and separate the flavor compounds in the sample. The determination is typically done by various mass spectrometric techniques. A flavor lexicon can aid the development of objective language for food.

== See also ==
- Aroma compound
- Artificial butter flavoring
- Ester (for list of some artificial flavor chemical compounds)
- Flavour and Fragrance Journal
- Food additive
- Fragrance oil
- Katsuobushi
- Off-flavor
- Palatability
- Seasoning
- Taste bud
