= Quantitative Descriptive Analysis =

Developed by Tragon Corporation in 1974, Quantitative Descriptive Analysis (QDA) is a behavioral sensory evaluation approach that uses descriptive panels to measure a product's sensory characteristics. Panel members use their senses to identify perceived similarities and differences in products, and articulate those perceptions in their own words. Sensory evaluation is a science that measures, analyzes, and interprets the reactions of the senses of sight, smell, sound, taste, and texture (or kinesthesis) to products. It is a people science; i.e., people are essential to obtain information about products.

Tragon QDA is a registered trademark with the United States Patent and Trademark Office. The term was coined by Herbert Stone (a food scientist) and Joel L. Sidel (a psychologist) in 1974 while at the Stanford Research Institute, (now known as SRI International (SRI)). Stone and Sidel later founded Tragon Corporation, a successful spin-off of SRI, to develop and market QDA.

Originally developed within the food industry, QDA is the basis of many disciplines that involve the senses, such as clothing, cosmetics, and electronics.

== Quantitative vs. qualitative research ==
Many researchers view quantitative research design as the best approach to scientific research because it offers precise measurement and analysis. In quantitative research design the researcher will count and classify, and build statistical models to then explain what is observed. Data collected using this research approach is in the form of numbers and statistics. In the article entitled, “An Analysis of the Strengths and Limitations of Qualitative and Quantitative Research Paradigms”, author Atieno (2009), suggests, “quantitative research paradigm…is empirical in nature; it is also known as the scientific research paradigm” . This research process includes a method of deductive reasoning by use of measurable tools to collect relevant data. Quantitative research then results in precise measurements.

== Key aspects of Quantitative Descriptive Analysis ==
QDA is a behavioral approach that uses descriptive panels to measure a product's sensory characteristics. The key aspects of the methodology of Stone and Sidel are:

- Subjects are consumers who are moderate to heavy users of the product.
- Panels are a small number (e.g., 8 - 15) of experienced subjects.
- Subjects are screened for sensitivity to product differences.
- The subjects, not the researchers, formulate the descriptions in their own terms of the sensory attributes under study. For example, subjects may be asked to rate a mineral supplement in terms of its "bitterness" rather than its "alkalinity".
- Data are collected from subjects without discussion among the subjects.
- Quantitative, not qualitative, assessments are made. Subjective descriptions such as "like", "dislike", good", or "bad" are irrelevant.
- Interval scales are used. Relative assessments are more important than absolute assessments.
- Responses are often graphically implemented (n order to avert biases associated with some numbers) and are subsequently transformed to numerical assessments, such as on a scale of 0 - 60 or 0 - 100.
- Products are presented for evaluation multiple times by the subjects. Replication allows for Analysis of Variation (ANOVA) to establish subject performance.

== Analysis methods ==
Analyses of QDA data include:

- Analysis of Variance (ANOVA)
- Duncan's New Multiple Range Test (MRT)
- Principal Component Analysis (PCA)
- Pearson Product-Moment Correlation Coefficient (PPMNN or PMC)
