= Sensory analysis =

Consumer product-testing method

Sensory analysis (or sensory evaluation) is a scientific discipline that applies principles of experimental design and statistical analysis to the use of human senses (sight, smell, taste, touch and hearing) for the purposes of evaluating consumer products. This method of testing products is generally used during the marketing and advertising phase. The discipline requires panels of human assessors, on whom the products are tested, and recording their responses. By applying statistical techniques to the results it is possible to make inferences and insights about the products under test. Most large consumer goods companies have departments dedicated to sensory analysis. Sensory analysis can mainly be broken down into three sub-sections:

- Analytical testing (dealing with objective facts about products)
- Affective testing (dealing with subjective facts such as preferences)
- Perception (the biochemical and psychological aspects of sensation)

Sensory analysis is a core component of organoleptic testing, dating back to the famous treatise De architectura by Vitruvius.

== Analytical testing ==
This type of testing is concerned with obtaining objective facts about products. This could range from basic discrimination testing (e.g. Do two or more products differ from each other?) to descriptive analysis (e.g. What are the characteristics of two or more products?). The type of panel required for this type of testing would normally be a trained panel.

There are several types of sensory tests. The most classic is the sensory profile. In this test, each assessor describes each product by means of a questionnaire. The questionnaire includes a list of descriptors (e.g., bitterness, acidity, etc.). The assessor rates each descriptor for each product depending on the intensity of the descriptor he perceives in the product (e.g., 0 = very weak to 10 = very strong). In the method of Free choice profiling, each taster builds his own questionnaire.

Another family of methods is known as holistic as they focus on the product's overall appearance. This is the case of the categorization and the napping.

== Affective testing ==
Also known as consumer testing, this type of testing concerns obtaining subjective data, or how well products are likely to be accepted. Usually, large (50 or more) panels of untrained personnel are recruited for this type of testing, although smaller focus groups can be utilized to gain insights into products. The range of testing can vary from simple comparative testing (e.g. Which do you prefer, A or B?) to structured questioning regarding the magnitude of acceptance of individual characteristics (e.g. Please rate the "fruity aroma": dislike|neither|like).

Affective testing is generally used by larger companies distributing products on a larger scale, such as cereal brands, clothing brands, and accessories used in daily life. For example, a small company on the verge of a breakthrough for a specific medicine wouldn't use wide-scale affective testing to see if the medicine would work. Companies such as this would use a specific panel of judges who require this medicine to test whether or not it would work.

== See also ==
- European Sensory Network
- Food Quality and Preference
- Journal of Sensory Studies
- Just-About-Right scale
- Pangborn Sensory Science Symposium

== Bibliography ==
- ASTM MNL14 The Role of Sensory Analysis in Quality Control, 1992
- ISO 16820 Sensory Analysis - Methodology - Sequential Analysis
- ISO 5495 Sensory Analysis - Methodology - Paired Comparisons
- ISO 13302 Sensory Analysis - Methods for assessing modifications to the flavour of foodstuffs due to packaging
- Sensory Evaluation Techniques- Morten C. Meilgaard, Gail Vance Civille, B. Thomas Carr - 4th edition, 2007
