= Immunization =

Process strengthening the immune system

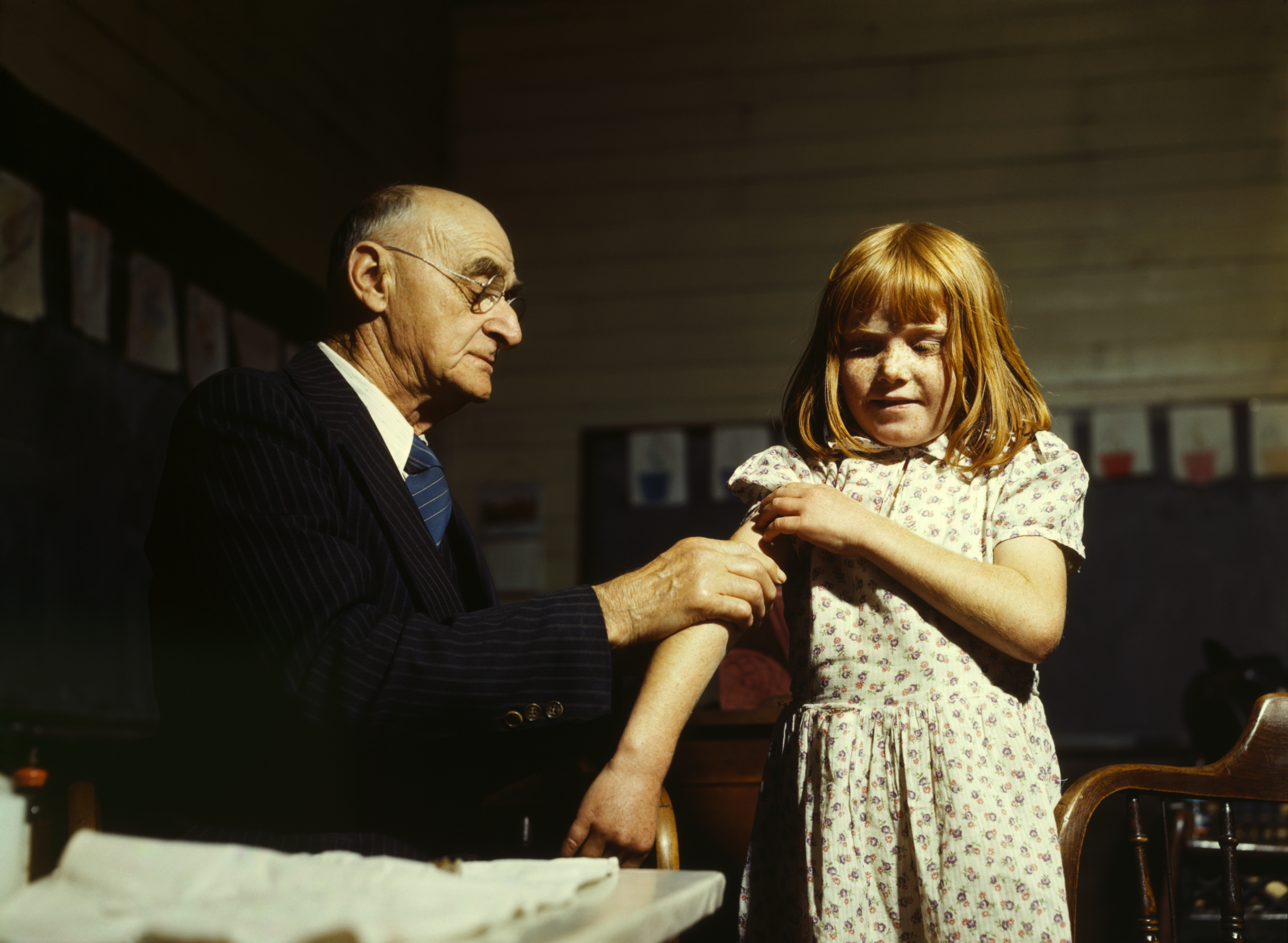
Dr. Schreiber of San Augustine giving a typhoid inoculation at a rural school, San Augustine County, Texas. Transfer from U.S. Office of War Information, 1944.

Immunization, or immunisation, is the process by which an individual's immune system becomes fortified against an infectious agent (known as the immunogen). When this system is exposed to molecules that are foreign to the body, called non-self, it will orchestrate an immune response, and it will also develop the ability to quickly respond to a subsequent encounter because of immunological memory. This is a function of the adaptive immune system. Therefore, by exposing a human, or an animal, to an immunogen in a controlled way, its body can learn to protect itself: this is called active immunization. The most important elements of the immune system that are improved by immunization are the T cells, B cells, and the antibodies B cells produce. Memory B cells and memory T cells are responsible for a swift response to a second encounter with a foreign molecule. Passive immunization is direct introduction of these elements into the body, instead of production of these elements by the body itself.

Immunization happens in various ways, both in the wild and as done by human efforts in health care. Natural immunity is gained by those organisms whose immune systems succeed in fighting off a previous infection, if the relevant pathogen is one for which immunization is even possible. Natural immunity can have degrees of effectiveness (partial rather than absolute) and may fade over time (within months, years, or decades, depending on the pathogen). In health care, the main technique of artificial induction of immunity is vaccination, which is a major form of prevention of disease, whether by prevention of infection (pathogen fails to mount sufficient reproduction in the host), prevention of severe disease (infection still happens but is not severe), or both. Vaccination against vaccine-preventable diseases is a major relief of disease burden even though it usually cannot eradicate a disease. Vaccines against microorganisms that cause diseases can prepare the body's immune system, thus helping to fight or prevent an infection. The fact that mutations can cause cancer cells to produce proteins or other molecules that are known to the body forms the theoretical basis for therapeutic cancer vaccines. Other molecules can be used for immunization as well, for example in experimental vaccines against nicotine (NicVAX) or the hormone ghrelin in experiments to create an obesity vaccine.

Immunizations are often widely stated as less risky and an easier way to become immune to a particular disease than risking a milder form of the disease itself. They are important for both adults and children in that they can protect us from the many diseases out there. Immunization not only protects children against deadly diseases but also helps in developing children's immune systems. Through the use of immunizations, some infections and diseases have almost completely been eradicated throughout the World. One example is polio. Thanks to dedicated health care professionals and the parents of children who vaccinated on schedule, polio has been eliminated in the U.S. since 1979. Polio is still found in other parts of the world so certain people could still be at risk of getting it. This includes those people who have never had the vaccine, those who did not receive all doses of the vaccine, or those traveling to areas of the world where polio is still prevalent. Active immunization/vaccination has been named one of the "Ten Great Public Health Achievements in the 20th Century".

== History ==
Before the introduction of vaccines, people could only become immune to an infectious disease by contracting the disease and surviving it. Smallpox (variola) was prevented in this way by inoculation, which produced a milder effect than the natural disease. The first clear reference to smallpox inoculation was made by the Chinese author Wan Quan (1499–1582) in his Douzhen xinfa (痘疹心法) published in 1549. In China, powdered smallpox scabs were blown up the noses of the healthy. The patients would then develop a mild case of the disease and from then on were immune to it. The technique did have a 0.5–2.0% mortality rate, but that was considerably less than the 20–30% mortality rate of the disease itself. Two reports on the Chinese practice of inoculation were received by the Royal Society in London in 1700; one by Dr. Martin Lister who received a report by an employee of the East India Company stationed in China and another by Clopton Havers. According to Voltaire (1742), the Turks derived their use of inoculation from neighbouring Circassia. Voltaire does not speculate on where the Circassians derived their technique from, though he reports that the Chinese have practiced it "these hundred years". It was introduced into England from Turkey by Lady Mary Wortley Montagu in 1721 and used by Zabdiel Boylston in Boston the same year. In 1798 Edward Jenner introduced inoculation with cowpox (smallpox vaccine), a much safer procedure. This procedure, referred to as vaccination, gradually replaced smallpox inoculation, now called variolation to distinguish it from vaccination. Until the 1880s vaccine/vaccination referred only to smallpox, but Louis Pasteur developed immunization methods for chicken cholera and anthrax in animals and for human rabies, and suggested that the terms vaccine/vaccination should be extended to cover the new procedures. This can cause confusion if care is not taken to specify which vaccine is used e.g. measles vaccine or influenza vaccine.

== Passive and active immunization ==
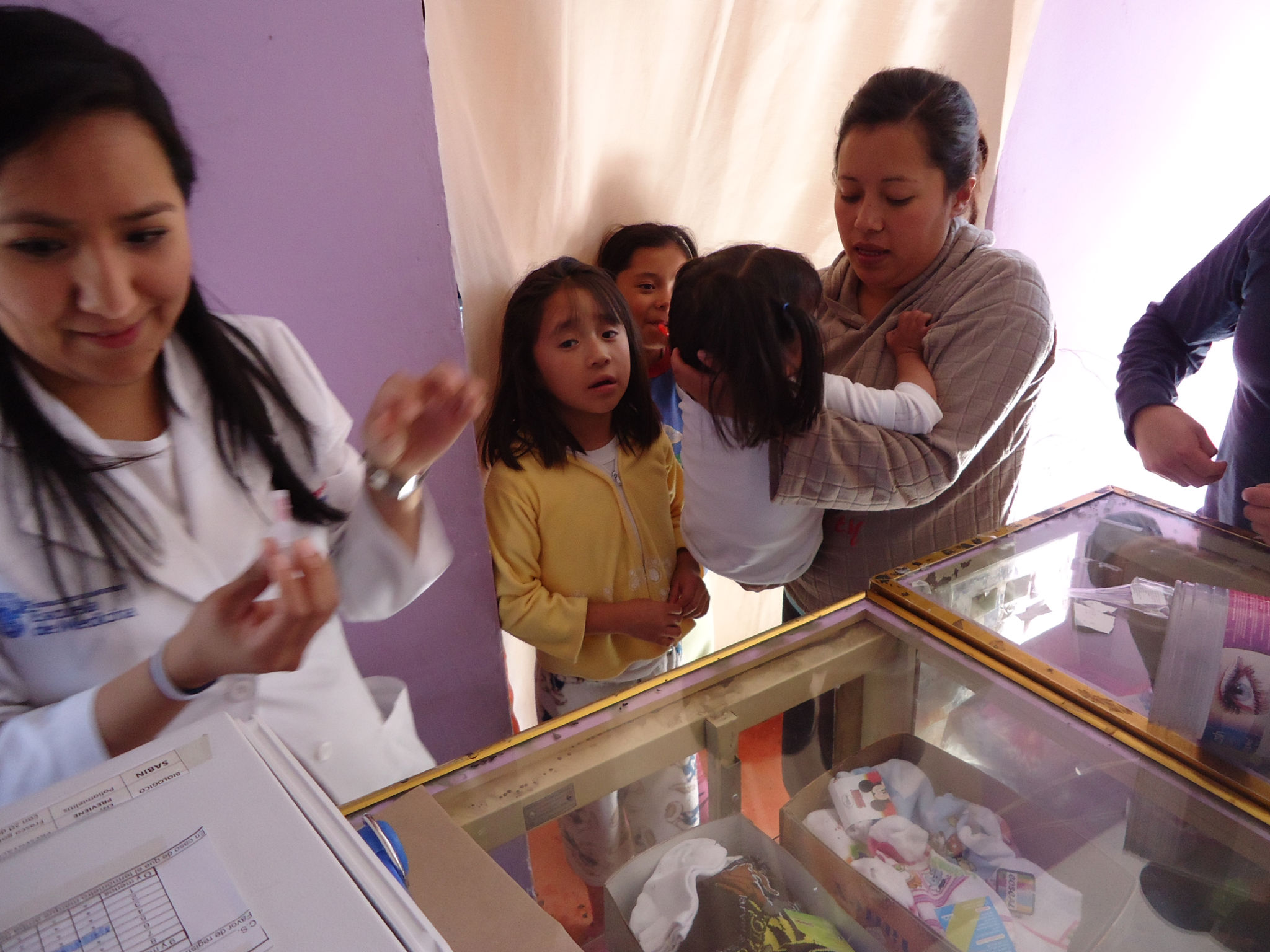
Medical student participating in a polio vaccine campaign in Mexico

Immunization can be achieved in an active or passive manner: vaccination is an active form of immunization.

=== Active immunization ===
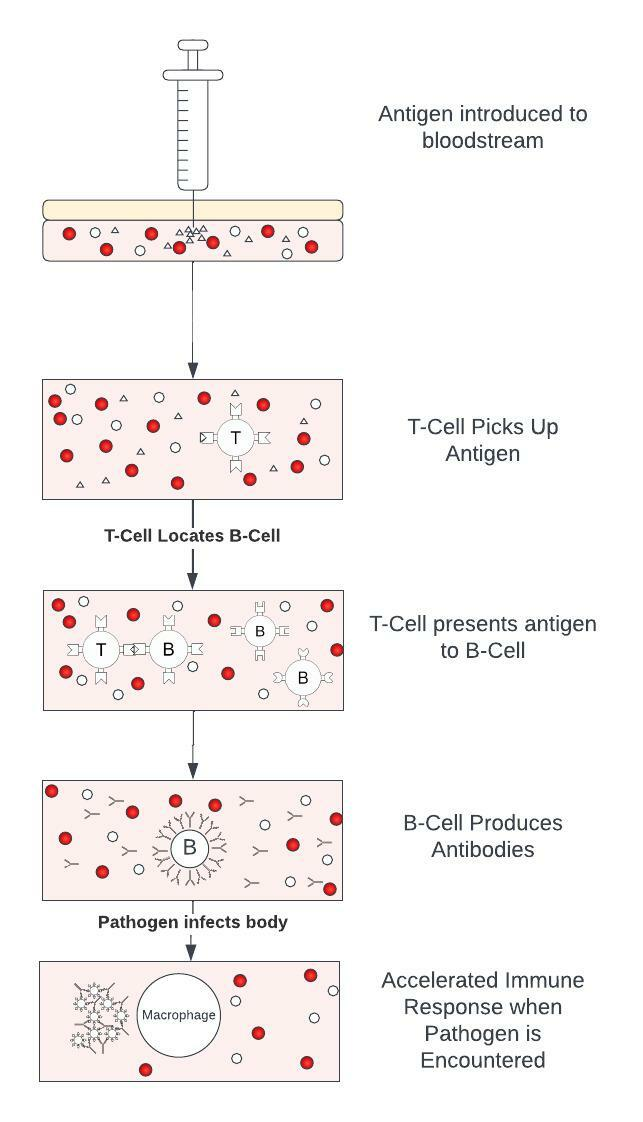
A simplified diagram showing the process of immunization through the production of anti-bodies

Active immunization can occur naturally when a person comes in contact with, for example, a microbe. The immune system will eventually create antibodies and other defenses against the microbe. The next time, the immune response against this microbe can be very efficient; this is the case in many of the childhood infections that a person only contracts once, but then is immune.

Artificial active immunization is where the microbe, or parts of it, are injected into the person before they are able to take it in naturally. If whole microbes are used, they are pre-treated.

The importance of immunization is so great that the American Centers for Disease Control and Prevention has named it one of the "Ten Great Public Health Achievements in the 20th Century". Live attenuated vaccines have decreased pathogenicity. Their effectiveness depends on the immune systems ability to replicate and elicits a response similar to natural infection. It is usually effective with a single dose. Examples of live, attenuated vaccines include measles, mumps, rubella, MMR, yellow fever, varicella, rotavirus, and influenza (LAIV).

=== Passive immunization ===
Passive immunization occurs when pre-synthesized elements of the immune system are transferred to a person, so the body does not need to produce these elements itself. Currently, antibodies are used for passive immunization. This method of immunization begins to work very quickly but it is short lasting, because the antibodies are naturally broken down. If there are no B cells to produce more antibodies, they will disappear.

Passive immunization occurs physiologically, when antibodies are transferred from mother to fetus during pregnancy, to protect the fetus before and shortly after birth.

Artificial passive immunization is typically administered by injection and is used in cases of recent outbreak of a particular disease or as an emergency treatment for toxicity, such as tetanus. The antibodies can be produced in animals, called "serum therapy," although there is a high chance of anaphylactic shock because of immunity against animal serum itself. Thus, humanized antibodies produced in vitro by cell culture are used instead if available.

== Economics of immunizations ==
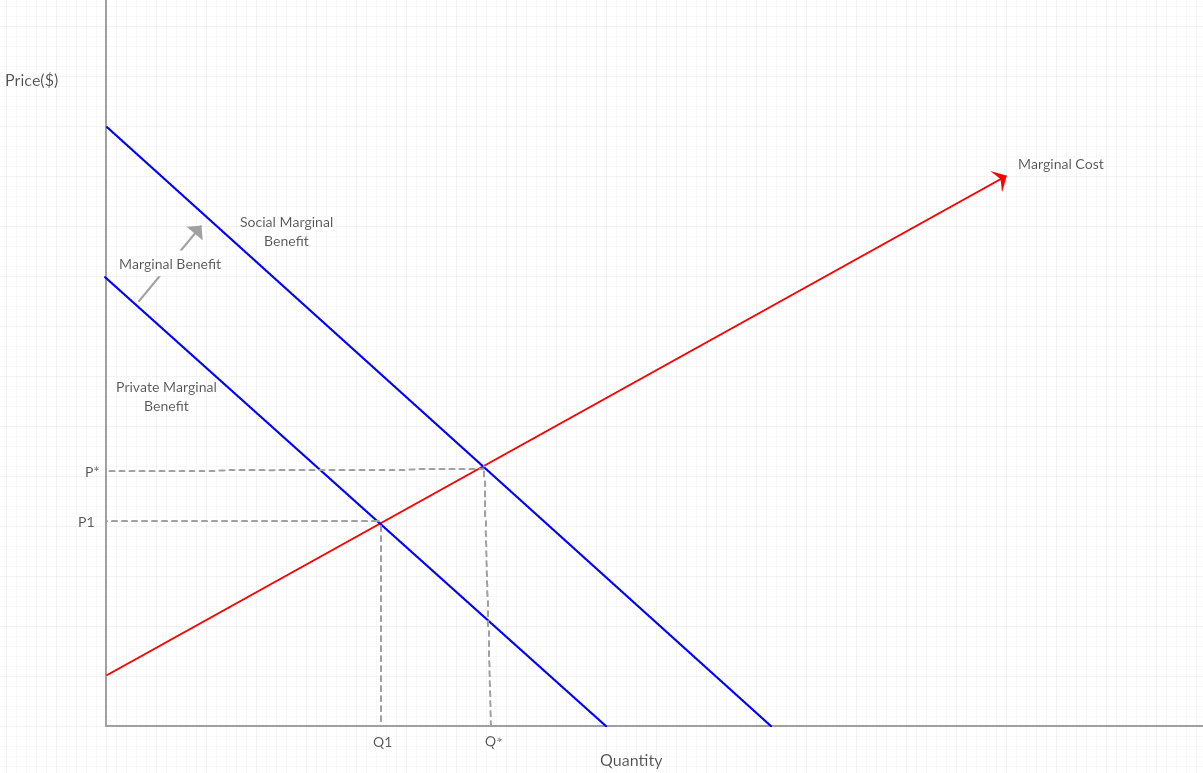
If individuals make the decision to immunize based on the Private Marginal Benefit we see a quantity of Q1 at the price P1 while the socially optimal point is at quantity Q* and price P*. The distance between the private and marginal benefit lines is the cost of the marginal benefit to society.

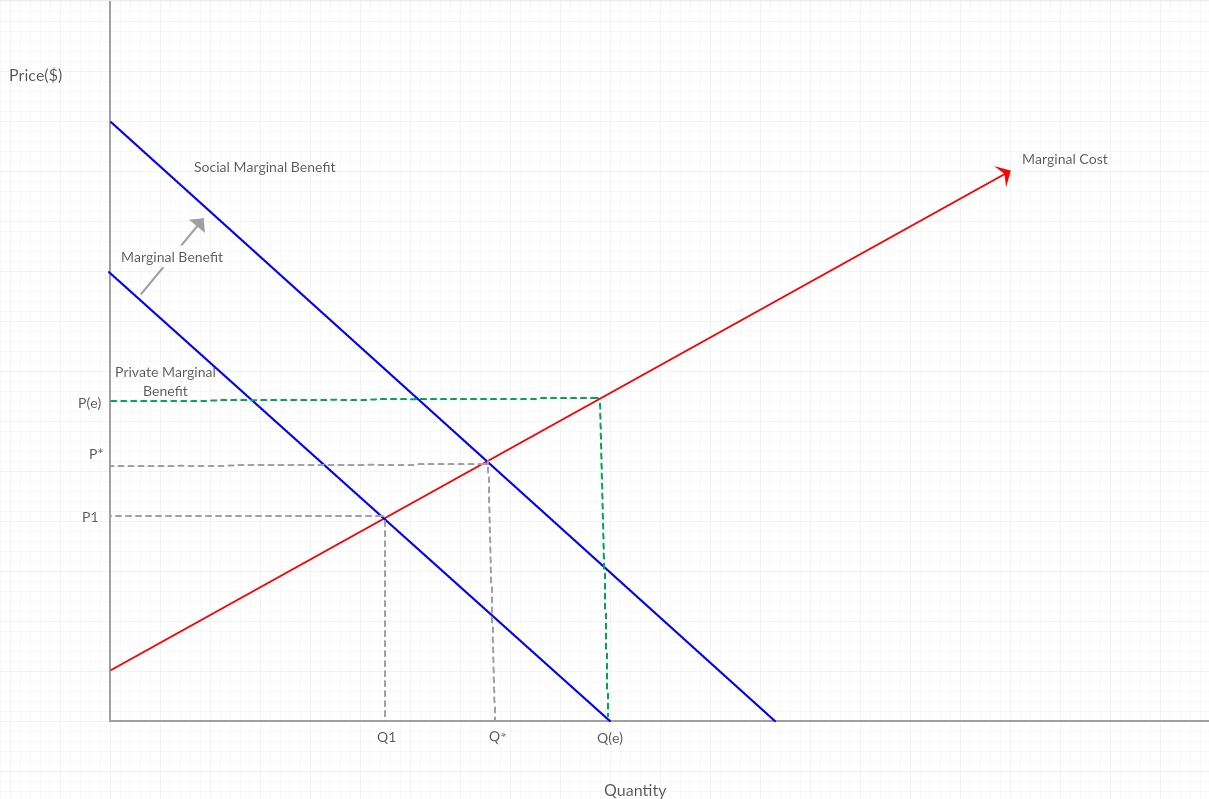
Immunization A does not have a social marginal benefit large enough to shift Q1 to Q(e), instead it lands at Q*.

=== Positive externality ===
Immunizations impose what is known as a positive consumer externality on society. In addition to providing the individual with protection against certain antigens it adds greater protection to all other individuals in society through herd immunity. Because this extra protection is not accounted for in the market transactions for immunizations we see an undervaluing of the marginal benefit of each immunization. This market failure is caused by individuals making decisions based on their private marginal benefit instead of the social marginal benefit. Society's undervaluing of immunizations means that through normal market transactions we end up at a quantity that is lower than what is socially optimal.

For example, if individual A values their own immunity to an antigen at $100 but the immunization costs $150, individual A will decide against receiving immunization. However, if the added benefit of herd immunity means person B values person A's immunity at $70 then the total social marginal benefit of their immunization is $170. Individual A's private marginal benefit being lower than the social marginal benefit leads to an under-consumption of immunizations.

=== Socially optimal outcome ===
Having private marginal benefits lower than social marginal benefits will always lead to an under-consumption of any good. The size of the disparity is determined by the value that society places on each different immunization. Many times, immunizations do not reach a socially optimum quantity high enough to eradicate the antigen. Instead, they reach a social quantity that allows for an optimal amount of sick individuals. Most of the commonly immunized diseases in the United States still see a small presence with occasional larger outbreaks. Measles is a good example of a disease whose social optimum leaves enough room for outbreaks in the United States that often lead to the deaths of a handful of individuals.

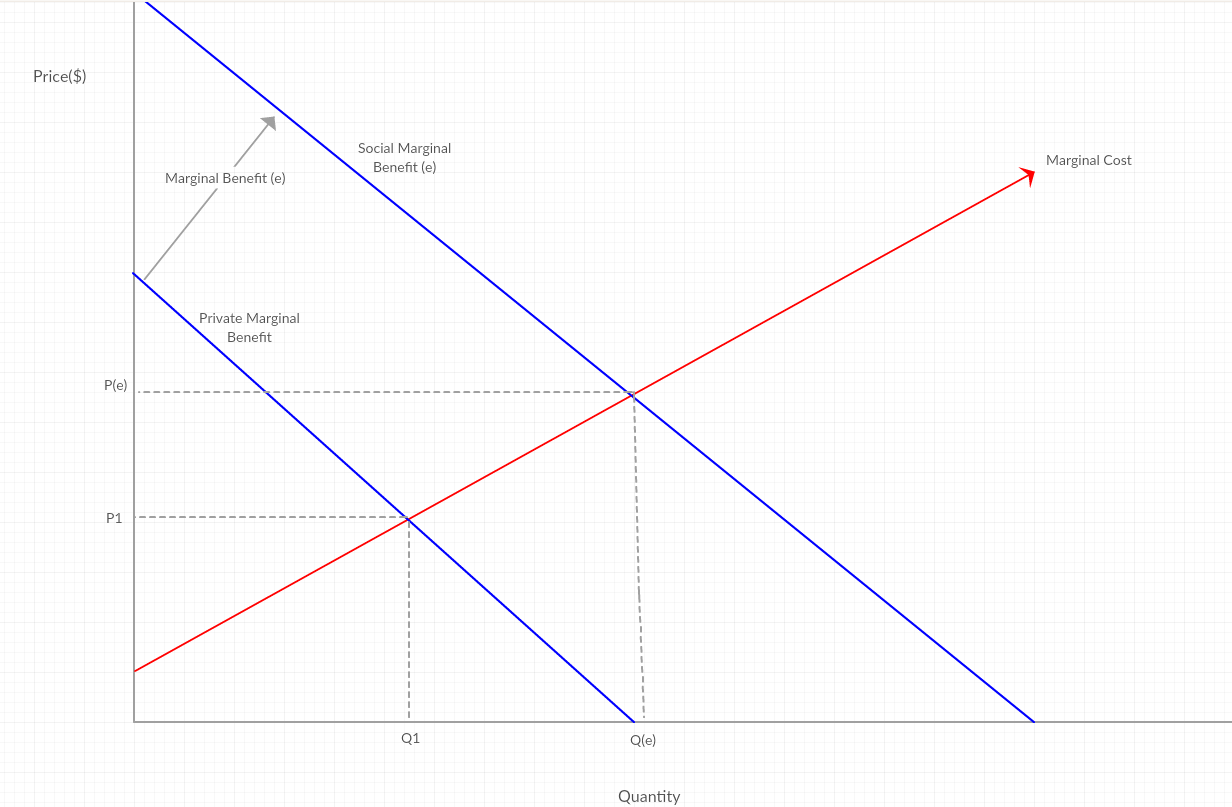
Immunization B has a social marginal benefit large enough to bring Q1 to Q(e), the quantity at which eradication occurs.

There are also examples of illnesses so dangerous that the social optimum ended with the eradication of the virus, such as smallpox. In these cases, the social marginal benefit is so large that society is willing to pay the cost to reach a level of immunization that makes the spread and survival of the disease impossible.

Despite the severity of certain illnesses, the cost of immunization versus the social marginal benefit means that total eradication is not always the end goal of immunization. Though it is hard to tell exactly where the socially optimal outcome is, we know that it is not the eradication of all disease for which an immunization exists.

=== Internalizing the externality ===
In order to internalize the positive externality imposed by immunizations payments equal to the marginal benefit must be made. In countries like the United States these payment usually come in the form of subsidies from the government. Before 1962 immunization programs in the United States were run on the local and state level of governments. The inconsistency in subsidies lead to some regions of the United States reaching the socially optimal quantity while other regions were left without subsidies and remained at the private marginal benefit level of immunizations. Since 1962 and the Vaccination Assistance Act, the United States as a whole has been moving towards the socially optimal outcome on a larger scale. Despite government subsidies it is difficult to tell when social optimum has been achieved. In addition to hardships determining the true social marginal benefit of immunizations we see cultural movements shifting private marginal benefit curves. Vaccine controversies have changed the way some private citizens view the marginal benefit of being immunized. If Individual A believes that there is a large health risk, possibly larger than the antigen itself, associated with immunization they will not be willing to pay for or receive immunization. With fewer willing participants and a widening marginal benefit reaching a social optimum becomes more difficult for governments to achieve through subsidies.

Outside of government intervention through subsidies, non profit organizations can also move a society towards the socially optimal outcome by providing free immunizations to developing regions. Without the ability to afford the immunizations to begin with, developing societies will not be able to reach a quantity determined by private marginal benefits. By running immunization programs organizations are able to move privately under-immunized communities towards the social optimum.

== Race, ethnicity and immunization ==
In the United States, race and ethnicity are strong determinants of utilization of preventive and therapeutic health services as well as health outcomes. Rates of infant mortality and most of the leading causes of overall mortality have been higher in African Americans than in European Americans. A recent analysis of mortality from influenza and pneumonia revealed that African Americans died of these causes at higher rates than European Americans in 1999–2018. Contributing to these racial disparities are lower rates of immunization against influenza and pneumococcal pneumonia. During the COVID-19 pandemic, death rates have been higher in African Americans than European Americans and vaccination rates have lagged in African Americans during the roll-out. Among Hispanics immunization rates are lower than those in non-Hispanic whites.

== See also ==
- Immunization registry
- Influenza vaccine
- Network theory
- Pandemic
- Targeted immunization strategies
- Vaccination
- Correlates of immunity
- Vaccine-preventable diseases
- World Immunization Week
