= PDN =

PDN may refer to:

== Digital ==
- PDN Gateway (Packet Data Network Gateway),
- PDN Mail, electronic messaging developed by Prime Computer
- Public data network
- Paint.NET

== File extension ==
- Portable Draughts Notation (.PDN), the standard computer format for recording draughts games
- .PDN, the native format for the graphics editing program Paint.NET

== Publication ==
- Pacific Daily News, a newspaper based on Guam
- Photo District News, US publication for photographers

== Entity ==
- Department of Physiology, Development and Neuroscience, University of Cambridge
- National Democratic Party (Argentina) (Partido Demócrata Nacional)

== Other ==
- ISO 639:pdn or Podena language, spoken in Indonesia
- Phenotypic disease network (PDN)
