= Network medicine =

Network medicine is the application of network science towards identifying, preventing, and treating diseases. This field focuses on using network topology and network dynamics towards identifying diseases and developing medical drugs. Biological networks, such as protein-protein interactions and metabolic pathways, are utilized by network medicine. Disease networks, which map relationships between diseases and biological factors, also play an important role in the field. Epidemiology is extensively studied using network science as well; social networks and transportation networks are used to model the spreading of disease across populations. Network medicine is a medically focused area of systems biology.

== Background ==
The term "network medicine" was introduced by Albert-László Barabási in the article "Network Medicine – From Obesity to the 'Diseasome'", published in The New England Journal of Medicine, in 2007. Barabási states that biological systems, similarly to social and technological systems, contain many components that are connected in complicated relationships but are organized by simple principles. Relaying on the tools and principles of network theory, the organizing principles can be analyzed by representing systems as complex networks, which are collections of nodes linked together by a particular biological or molecular relationship. For networks pertaining to medicine, nodes represent biological factors (biomolecules, diseases, phenotypes, etc.) and links (edges) represent their relationships (physical interactions, shared metabolic pathway, shared gene, shared trait, etc.).

Barabasi suggested that understanding human disease requires us to focus on three key networks, the metabolic network, the disease network, and the social network. The network medicine is based on the idea that understanding complexity of gene regulation, metabolic reactions, and protein-protein interactions and that representing these as complex networks will shed light on the causes and mechanisms of diseases. It is possible, for example, to infer a bipartite graph representing the connections of diseases to their associated genes using the OMIM database. The projection of the diseases, called the human disease network (HDN), is a network of diseases connected to each other if they share a common gene. Using the HDN, diseases can be classified and analyzed through the genetic relationships between them. Network medicine has proven to be a valuable tool in analyzing big biomedical data.

== Research areas ==
=== Interactome ===
The whole set of molecular interactions in the human cell, also known as the interactome, can be used for disease identification and prevention. These networks have been technically classified as scale-free, disassortative, small-world networks, having a high betweenness centrality.

Protein-protein interactions have been mapped, using proteins as nodes and their interactions between each other as links. These maps utilize databases such as BioGRID and the Human Protein Reference Database. The metabolic network encompasses the biochemical reactions in metabolic pathways, connecting two metabolites if they are in the same pathway. Researchers have used databases such as KEGG to map these networks. Others networks include cell signaling networks, gene regulatory networks, and RNA networks.

Using interactome networks, one can discover and classify diseases, as well as develop treatments through knowledge of its associations and their role in the networks. One observation is that diseases can be classified not by their principle phenotypes (pathophenotype) but by their disease module, which is a neighborhood or group of components in the interactome that, if disrupted, results in a specific pathophenotype. Disease modules can be used in a variety of ways, such as predicting disease genes that have not been discovered yet. Therefore, network medicine looks to identify the disease module for a specific pathophenotype using clustering algorithms.

=== Diseasome ===
Human disease networks, also called the diseasome, are networks in which the nodes are diseases and the links, the strength of correlation between them. This correlation is commonly quantified based on associated cellular components that two diseases share. The first-published human disease network (HDN) looked at genes, finding that many of the disease associated genes are non-essential genes, as these are the genes that do not completely disrupt the network and are able to be passed down generations. Metabolic disease networks (MDN), in which two diseases are connected by a shared metabolite or metabolic pathway, have also been extensively studied and is especially relevant in the case of metabolic disorders.

Three representations of the diseasome are:

- Shared gene formalism states that if a gene is linked to two different disease phenotypes, then the two diseases likely have a common genetic origin (genetic disorders).
- Shared metabolic pathway formalism states that if a metabolic pathway is linked to two different diseases, then the two diseases likely have a shared metabolic origin (metabolic disorders).
- Disease comorbidity formalism uses phenotypic disease networks (PDN), where two diseases are linked if the observed comorbidity between their phenotypes exceeds a predefined threshold. This does not look at the mechanism of action of diseases, but captures disease progression and how highly connected diseases correlate to higher mortality rates.

Some disease networks connect diseases to associated factors outside the human cell. Networks of environmental and genetic etiological factors linked with shared diseases, called the "etiome", can be also used to assess the clustering of environmental factors in these networks and understand the role of the environment on the interactome. The human symptom-disease network (HSDN), published in June 2014, showed that the symptoms of disease and disease associated cellular components were strongly correlated and that diseases of the same categories tend to form highly connected communities, with respect to their symptoms.

=== Pharmacology ===
Network pharmacology is a developing field based in systems pharmacology that looks at the effect of drugs on both the interactome and the diseasome. The topology of a biochemical reaction network determines the shape of drug dose-response curve as well as the type of drug-drug interactions, thus can help design efficient and safe therapeutic strategies. In addition, the drug-target network (DTN) can play an important role in understanding the mechanisms of action of approved and experimental drugs. The network theory view of pharmaceuticals is based on the effect of the drug in the interactome, especially the region that the drug target occupies. Combination therapy for a complex disease (polypharmacology) is suggested in this field since one active pharmaceutical ingredient (API) aimed at one target may not affect the entire disease module. The concept of disease modules can be used to aid in drug discovery, drug design, and the development of biomarkers for disease detection. There can be a variety of ways to identifying drugs using network pharmacology; a simple example of this is the "guilt by association" method. This states if two diseases are treated by the same drug, a drug that treats one disease may treat the other. Drug repurposing, drug-drug interactions and drug side-effects have also been studied in this field. The next iteration of network pharmacology used entirely different disease definitions, defined as dysfunction in signaling modules derived from protein-protein interaction modules. The latter as well as the interactome had many conceptual shortcomings, e.g., each protein appears only once in the interactome, whereas in reality, one protein can occur in different contexts and different cellular locations. Such signaling modules are therapeutically best targeted at several sites, which is now the new and clinically applied definition of network pharmacology. To achieve higher than current precision, patients must not be selected solely on descriptive phenotypes but also based on diagnostics that detect the module dysregulation. Moreover, such mechanism-based network pharmacology has the advantage that each of the drugs used within one module is highly synergistic, which allows for reducing the doses of each drug, which then reduces the potential of these drugs acting on other proteins outside the module and hence the chance for unwanted side effects.

=== Network epidemics ===
Network epidemics has been built by applying network science to existing epidemic models, as many transportation networks and social networks play a role in the spread of disease. Social networks have been used to assess the role of social ties in the spread of obesity in populations. Epidemic models and concepts, such as spreading and contact tracing, have been adapted to be used in network analysis. These models can be used in public health policies, in order to implement strategies such as targeted immunization and has been recently used to model the spread of the Ebola virus epidemic in West Africa across countries and continents.

=== Drug prescription networks (DPNs) ===
Recently, some researchers tended to represent medication use in form of networks. The nodes in these networks represent medications and the edges represent some sort of relationship between these medications. Cavallo et al. (2013) described the topology of a co-prescription network to demonstrate which drug classes are most co-prescribed. Bazzoni et al. (2015) concluded that the DPNs of co-prescribed medications are dense, highly clustered, modular and assortative. Askar et al. (2021) created a network of the severe drug-drug interactions (DDIs) showing that it consisted of many clusters.

=== Patient similarity networks ===
In the biomedical field, networks (more precisely similarity networks) have been successfully adapted into Patient Similarity Networks (PSNs) to support clinical decision-making and advance precision medicine. In a PSN, nodes represent individual patients, while the weighted edges between them quantify the degree of phenotypic, clinical, or molecular similarity. Unlike traditional "one-size-fits-all" medical models that rely on broad population averages, PSNs leverage graph theory to treat individual patient complexity as unique. By mapping a patient's profile against a network of previous cases, researchers can analytically explore complex relationships and shift the focus toward highly personalized therapeutic strategies.

==== Data integration ====
While the construction of these networks can rely on a single data type, clinical research is increasingly moving towards the integration of vast and highly heterogeneous biomedical datasets to achieve a more comprehensive patient profile. These datasets include multi-omics profiles, electronic health records (EHRs), and medical imaging. Because these diverse data modalities operate on entirely different scales and contain varied background noise, specialized multi-view integration algorithms are frequently employed. For each pair of patients, a distance metric is calculated and transformed into a similarity score. These scores are then compiled into an affinity matrix, which summarizes the pairwise similarities across the entire cohort. From this matrix, an integrated network is constructed; by fusing information derived from multiple data types, the resulting network is capable of representing the full spectrum of the underlying data. This approach allows the network to effectively capture non-linear biological relationships that single-source analyses might miss.

==== Topological analysis ====
Once the integrated network is constructed, standard graph theory metrics are applied to extract clinically meaningful information from the data structure. Topological analysis evaluates the position of patients within the network; for example, node centrality measures can identify patients who are highly representative of a specific subgroup, while peripheral nodes with low degree centrality may correspond to rare phenotypes or clinical outliers. Furthermore, algorithms based on modularity optimization (such as the Louvain or Leiden algorithms) and spectral clustering are used to partition the network into distinct, densely connected communities, which may highlight the presence of different subtypes of patients commonly grouped under the same disese label.

==== Clinical applications ====
These topological structures translate directly into advanced clinical applications, such as disease subtyping and prognosis. Community detection, for example, allows researchers to uncover novel disease variants (clusters of individuals sharing specific molecular profiles that would probably similarly respond to the same treatment) even if they fall under the same broad diagnostic category. Additionally, PSNs are widely used for predictive modeling: the clinical trajectory, survival rate, or treatment response of a new patient can be inferred by evaluating the known outcomes of their closest topological neighbors. This network-based approach is increasingly applied to complex diseases, which arise from the interaction of multiple molecular layers and environmental factors. These applications span major medical fields, including oncology, cardiology, and neurodegenerative diseases, making PSNs a fundamental tool for patient risk stratification and network-based drug repurposing.

=== Other networks ===
The development of organs and other biological systems can be modelled as network structures where the clinical (e.g., radiographic, functional) characteristics can be represented as nodes and the relationships between these characteristics are represented as the links among such nodes. Therefore, it is possible to use networks to model how organ systems dynamically interact.

== Educational and clinical implementation ==
The Channing Division of Network Medicine at Brigham and Women's Hospital was created in 2012 to study, reclassify, and develop treatments for complex diseases using network science and systems biology. It currently involves more than 80 Harvard Medical School (HMS) faculty and focuses on three areas:

- Chronic Disease Epidemiology uses genomics and metabolomics in large, long-term epidemiology studies, such as the Nurses' Health Study.
- Systems Genetics & Genomics focuses on complex respiratory diseases, specifically COPD and asthma, in smaller population studies.
- Systems Pathology uses multidisciplinary approaches, including as control theory, dynamical systems, and combinatorial optimization, to understand complex diseases and guide biomarker design.

Massachusetts Institute of Technology offers an undergraduate course called "Network Medicine: Using Systems Biology and Signaling Networks to Create Novel Cancer Therapeutics". Also, Harvard Catalyst (The Harvard Clinical and Translational Science Center) offers a three-day course entitled "Introduction to Network Medicine", open to clinical and science professionals with doctorate degrees.

Current worldwide efforts in network medicine are coordinated by the Network Medicine Institute and Global Alliance, representing 33 leading universities and institutions around the world committed to improving global health.

== See also ==
- Biological network
- Biological network inference
- Bioinformatics
- Complex network
- Glossary of graph theory
- Graph theory
- Graphical models
- Human disease network
- Interactome
- Metabolic network
- Network dynamics
- Network science
- Network theory
- Network topology
- Pharmacology
- Systems biology
- Systems pharmacology
- Targeted immunization strategies
