= Narrative network =

A narrative network is a system that represents complex event sequences or characters’ interactions as depicted by a narrative text. Network science methodology offers an alternative way of analysing the patterns of relationships, composition and activities of events and actors studied in their own context. Network theory can contribute to the understanding of the structural properties of a text and the data contained in it. The meaning of the individual and the community in a narrative is conditional on their position in a system of social relationships reported by the author. Hence, a central problem when dealing with narratives is framing and organising the author's perspective of individual and collective connections to understand better the role of both the witness (viz. the persona that emerges from the narrative) and its testimony as reflected by the text. However, the category of narrative network is in its formative, initial phase and as a consequence it is hard to view as a stable and defined notion in linguistics, and beyond sociology.

== Overview: Narrative as a structure of a story in time ==
To be an object of study and analysis, time must be transformed into a causal sequence, and the only way this can be done is by narration. As a form of description, narrating inevitably requires sequencing in time. The direction of time is not a trivial thing, but the backbone of the information contained in the narrative itself. One has to bear in mind the fundamental concepts of Genette's narratology, mainly the concept of ‘order.’ This distinguishes three entities: story, narrative, and narration. The story generally corresponds to a series of events placed its chronological order (the story time). When these events are rearranged and represented in a form that has its own sequence and features by the author, it produces a narrative. Even if the narrated events are not chronologically ordered, being reported in the narrative's time, they always refer to a position in the story time.

The survey of any textual account ought to take into account its literary nature. Far from being a window that must be revealed to penetrate into a ‘historical truth,’ each historical document adds to the number of texts that must be interpreted if an approachable and intelligible picture of a given historical milieu is to be drawn. As pointed out by Peter Munz, "Narrative is the only literary device available which will reflect the past’s time structure." The pretension that conceives of history as the representation of the ‘actual’ should be put aside to acknowledge that one can only approach past structures by contrasting them with, or bonding them to, the imaginable world. In this way, and similar to Genette's conception of narrative order and time, a historical narrative implies not simply an account of events that happened in the transition from one point in time to another. Thence, historical narrative is a progressive ‘redescription’ of events and people that dismantles a structure encoded in one verbal mode in the beginning to justify the recoding of it in another mode at the end. Narratives are, thus, structures that contain complex systems that draw images of experience.

== Background ==
To approach new ways of making sense of narrative, one must first distinguish two different systems that can be found in the narrative structure: the sequence of events and the sequence of the actor's interactions. The former is the order in time in which all the events take place (Genette's narrative time). Although trivial, this identification is fundamental for the construction of the latter. I understand the sequence of social interactions as the set of the characters’ relationships ordered in relation to its appearance following the sequence of events. Both constitute interdependent systems that express the flow of the narrative on two different levels.

Defining what constitutes a relationship depends on the specific research questions formulated for the study of the narrative. The fact that two characters are mentioned as actors in a certain event can serve as a criterion for connecting two individuals (two actors are connected by the fact that they share one reported action). Criteria can, of course, be more detailed and precise. Depending on the specific phenomena of interest, one can frame the scope of the interactions to be identified throughout the narrative. For example, one might be interested in assessing the integration of an individual within a collective body. Indicators of social ties, as indicated by the text itself, would define the interaction criteria

== Current Studies ==
Authors such as Peter Bearman, Robert Faris, and James Moody have understood the sequence of events in a narrative as a complex event structure. By suggesting that the flow of the narrated events can be problematized as a complex structure, they focus on the similarities between the social structures and the narrative. Through these similarities they have defended the applicability of network methods for the analysis of historical data contained in texts.

Roberto Franzosi, and Bearman and Stovel have offered modelling techniques for narrative networks by focusing on the sequence of events. These authors have visualised the story time by connecting the events from the original narrative time. The constructed ‘narrative networks’ connect the events by causal relationships, viz. if action B lead to action A, then A and B are linked. By working on 'narrative networks,’ these authors defend it is possible to observe and measure new structural features of the narrative. They focus on autobiographical narratives of the rise and identity of fascism (the former) and Nazism (the latter). The substantive idea that they develop is that the observable narrative structure of life stories can provide insight into the process of identity formation among the witnesses of a delimited scope of time.

Although these are remarkable models of applied quantitative narrative analysis and network analysis, their proposed narrative networks represent sequence of events rather than of characters. These research strategies may have to be diversified to study aspects such as political influence and other non-institutional features of organizations or groups reported by the author through narration.
