= Quantum complex network =

Notion in network science of quantum information networks

Quantum complex networks are complex networks whose nodes are quantum computing devices. Quantum mechanics has been used to create secure quantum communications channels that are protected from hacking. Quantum communications offer the potential for secure enterprise-scale solutions.

== Motivation ==
In theory, it is possible to take advantage of quantum mechanics to create secure communications using features such as quantum key distribution is an application of quantum cryptography that enables secure communications Quantum teleportation can transfer data at a higher rate than classical channels.

== History ==
Successful quantum teleportation experiments in 1998. Prototypical quantum communication networks arrived in 2004. Large scale communication networks tend to have non-trivial topologies and characteristics, such as small world effect, community structure, or scale-free.

== Concepts ==
=== Qubits ===
In quantum information theory, qubits are analogous to bits in classical systems. A qubit is a quantum object that, when measured, can be found to be in one of only two states, and that is used to transmit information. Photon polarization or nuclear spin are examples of binary phenomena that can be used as qubits.

=== Entanglement ===
Quantum entanglement is a physical phenomenon characterized by correlation between the quantum states of two or more physically separate qubits. Maximally entangled states are those that maximize the entropy of entanglement. In the context of quantum communication, entangled qubits are used as a quantum channel.

=== Bell measurement ===
Bell measurement is a kind of joint quantum-mechanical measurement of two qubits such that, after the measurement, the two qubits are maximally entangled.

=== Entanglement swapping ===
Entanglement swapping is a strategy used in the study of quantum networks that allows connections in the network to change. For example, given 4 qubits, A, B, C and D, such that qubits C and D belong to the same station, while A and C belong to two different stations, and where qubit A is entangled with qubit C and qubit B is entangled with qubit D. Performing a Bell measurement for qubits A and B, entangles qubits A and B. It is also possible to entangle qubits C and D, despite the fact that these two qubits never interact directly with each other. Following this process, the entanglement between qubits A and C, and qubits B and D are lost. This strategy can be used to define network topology.

== Network structure ==
While models for quantum complex networks are not of identical structure, usually a node represents a set of qubits in the same station (where operations like Bell measurements and entanglement swapping can be applied) and an edge between node $i$ and $j$ means that a qubit in node $i$ is entangled to a qubit in node $j$, although those two qubits are in different places and so cannot physically interact. Quantum networks where the links are interaction terms instead of entanglement are also of interest.

=== Notation ===
Each node in the network contains a set of qubits in different states. To represent the quantum state of these qubits, it is convenient to use Dirac notation and represent the two possible states of each qubit as $|0\rangle$ and $|1\rangle$. In this notation, two particles are entangled if the joint wave function, $|\psi_{ij}\rangle$, cannot be decomposed as

$$|\psi_{ij}\rangle=|\phi\rangle_i\otimes |\phi\rangle_j,$$

where $|\phi\rangle_i$ represents the quantum state of the qubit at node i and $|\phi\rangle_j$ represents the quantum state of the qubit at node j.

Another important concept is maximally entangled states. The four states (the Bell states) that maximize the entropy of entanglement between two qubits can be written as follows:

$$|\Phi_{ij}^+\rangle = \frac{1}{\sqrt{2}} (|0\rangle_i \otimes |0\rangle_j + |1\rangle_i \otimes |1\rangle_j),$$

$$|\Phi_{ij}^-\rangle = \frac{1}{\sqrt{2}} (|0\rangle_i \otimes |0\rangle_j - |1\rangle_i \otimes |1\rangle_j),$$

$$|\Psi_{ij}^+\rangle = \frac{1}{\sqrt{2}} (|0\rangle_i \otimes |1\rangle_j + |1\rangle_i \otimes |0\rangle_j),$$

$$|\Psi_{ij}^-\rangle = \frac{1}{\sqrt{2}} (|0\rangle_i \otimes |1\rangle_j - |1\rangle_i \otimes |0\rangle_j).$$

== Models ==
=== Quantum random networks ===
The quantum random network model proposed by Perseguers et al. (2009) can be thought of as a quantum version of the Erdős–Rényi model. In this model, each node contains $N-1$ qubits, one for each other node. The degree of entanglement between a pair of nodes, represented by $p$, plays a similar role to the parameter $p$ in the Erdős–Rényi model in which two nodes form a connection with probability $p$, whereas in the context of quantum random networks, $p$ refers to the probability of converting an entangled pair of qubits to a maximally entangled state using only local operations and classical communication.

Using Dirac notation, a pair of entangled qubits connecting the nodes $i$ and $j$ is represented as

$$|\psi_{ij}\rangle=\sqrt{1-p/2}|0\rangle_i \otimes |0\rangle_j + \sqrt{p/2} |1\rangle_i\otimes|1\rangle_j,$$

For $p=0$, the two qubits are not entangled:

$$|\psi_{ij}\rangle=|0\rangle_i \otimes |0\rangle_j,$$

and for $p=1$, we obtain the maximally entangled state:

$$|\psi_{ij}\rangle=\sqrt{1/2}(|0\rangle_i \otimes |0\rangle_j + |1\rangle_i\otimes|1\rangle_j)$$.

For intermediate values of $p$, $0<p<1$, any entangled state is, with probability $p$, successfully converted to the maximally entangled state using LOCC operations.

One feature that distinguishes this model from its classical analogue is the fact that, in quantum random networks, links are only truly established after they are measured, and it is possible to exploit this fact to shape the final state of the network. For an initial quantum complex network with an infinite number of nodes, Perseguers et al. showed that, the right measurements and entanglement swapping, make it possible to collapse the initial network to a network containing any finite subgraph, provided that $p$ scales with $N$ as $p\sim N^Z$, where $Z\geq-2$. This result is contrary to classical graph theory, where the type of subgraphs contained in a network is bounded by the value of $z$.

=== Entanglement percolation ===
Entanglement percolation models attempt to determine whether a quantum network is capable of establishing a connection between two arbitrary nodes through entanglement, and to find the best strategies to create such connections.

Cirac et al. (2007) applied a model to complex networks by Cuquet et al. (2009), in which nodes are distributed in a lattice or in a complex network, and each pair of neighbors share two pairs of entangled qubits that can be converted to a maximally entangled qubit pair with probability $p$. We can think of maximally entangled qubits as the true links between nodes. In classical percolation theory, with a probability $p$ that two nodes are connected, $p$ has a critical value (denoted by $p_c$), so that if $p>p_c$ a path between two randomly selected nodes exists with a finite probability, and for $p<p_c$ the probability of such a path existing is asymptotically zero. $p_c$ depends only on the network topology.

A similar phenomenon was found in the model proposed by Cirac et al. (2007), where the probability of forming a maximally entangled state between two randomly selected nodes is zero if $p<p_c$ and finite if $p>p_c$. The main difference between classical and entangled percolation is that, in quantum networks, it is possible to change the links in the network, in a way changing the effective topology of the network. As a result, $p_c$ depends on the strategy used to convert partially entangled qubits to maximally connected qubits. With a naïve approach, $p_c$ for a quantum network is equal to $p_c$ for a classic network with the same topology. Nevertheless, it was shown that is possible to take advantage of quantum swapping to lower $p_c$ both in regular lattices and complex networks.

== See also ==
- Erdős–Rényi model
- Gradient network
- Network dynamics
- Network topology
- Quantum key distribution
- Quantum teleportation
