= Network dynamics =

Research field

Network dynamics is a research field for the study of networks whose status changes in time. The dynamics may refer to the structure of connections of the units of a network, to the collective internal state of the network, or both. The networked systems could be from the fields of biology, chemistry, physics, sociology, economics, computer science, etc. Networked systems are typically characterized as complex systems consisting of many units coupled by specific, potentially changing, interaction topologies.

For a dynamical systems' approach to discrete network dynamics, see sequential dynamical system.

== See also ==
- Biological network inference
- Cellular neural network
- Dual-phase evolution
- Dynamic Bayesian network
- Dynamic network analysis
- Dynamic single-frequency networks
- Gaussian network model
- Gene regulatory network
- Gradient network
- Network planning and design
- Neural network
- Neurodynamics
- Small-world network
- Technology Dynamics
