= Human disease network =

A human disease network is a network of human disorders and diseases with reference to their genetic origins or other features. More specifically, it is the map of human disease associations referring mostly to disease genes. For example, in a human disease network, two diseases are linked if they share at least one associated gene. A typical human disease network usually derives from bipartite networks which consist of both diseases and genes information. Additionally, some human disease networks use other features such as symptoms and proteins to associate diseases.

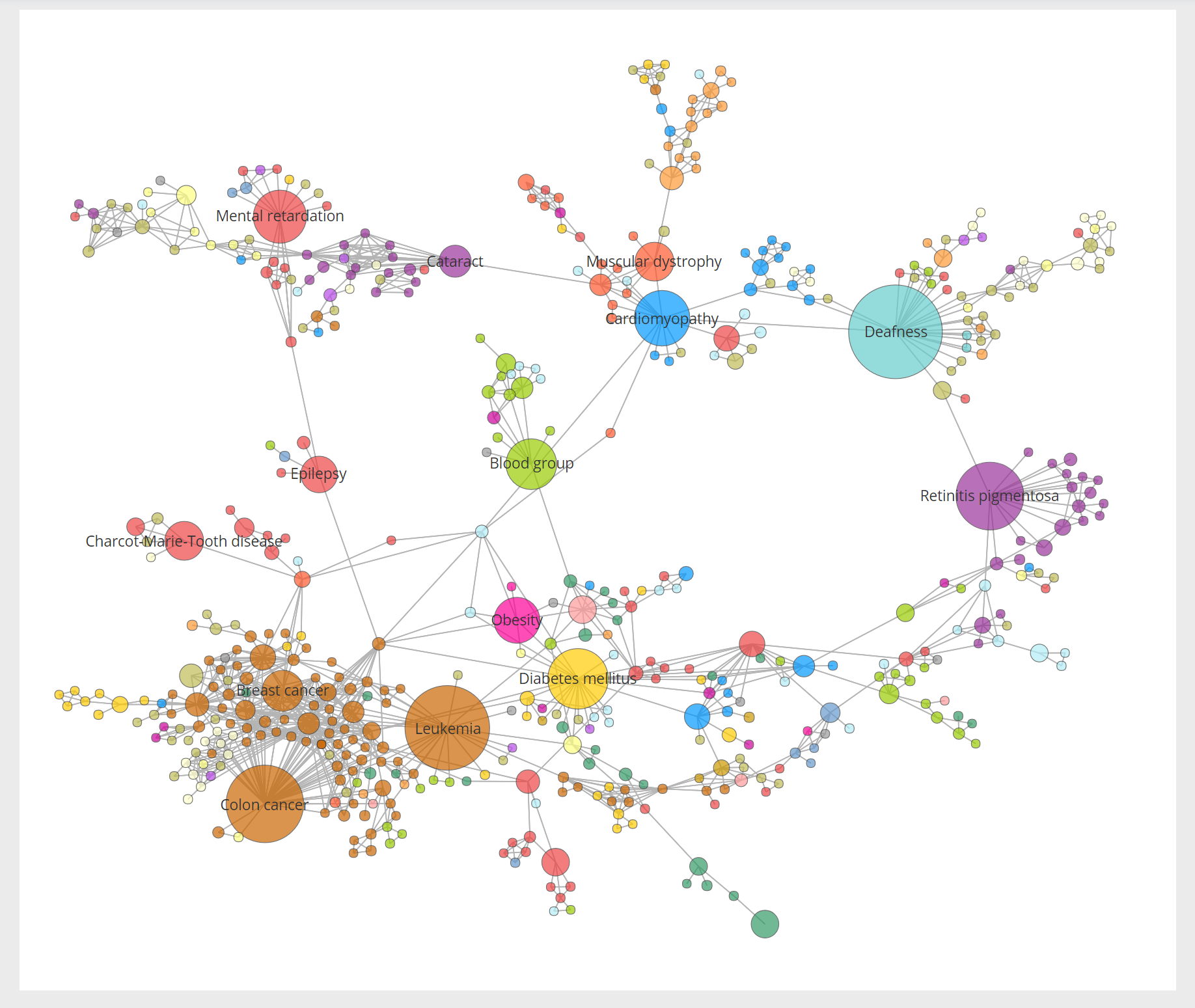
Human disease network. It is generated as a Plotly plot. Nodes are diseases. Two diseases are connected if they share a genetic component.

== History ==
In 2007, Goh et al. constructed a disease-gene bipartite graph using information from OMIM database and termed human disease network. In 2009, Barrenas et al. derived complex disease-gene network using GWAs (Genome Wide Association studies). In the same year, Hidalgo et al. published a novel way of building human phenotypic disease networks in which diseases were connected according to their calculated distance. In 2011, Cusick et al. summarized studies on genotype-phenotype associations in cellular context. In 2014, Zhou, et al. built a symptom-based human disease network by mining biomedical literature database.

== Properties ==
A large-scale human disease network shows scale-free property. The degree distribution follows a power law suggesting that only a few diseases connect to a large number of diseases, whereas most diseases have few links to others. Such network also shows a clustering tendency by disease classes.

In a symptom-based disease network, disease are also clustered according to their categories. Moreover, diseases sharing the same symptom are more likely to share the same genes and protein interactions.

== See also ==
- Bioinformatics
- Genome
- Network theory
- Network medicine
