= Shake it Up Australia Foundation =

Australian non-for-profit foundation

The Shake It Up Australia Foundation
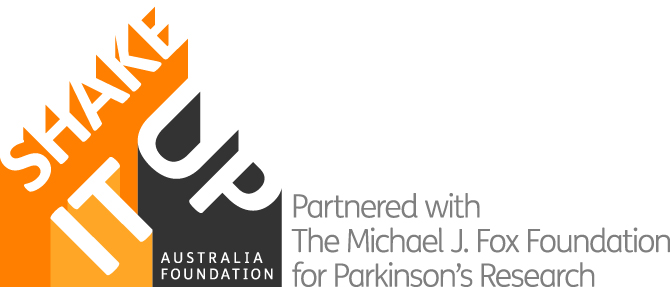
- Abbreviation: SIUAF
- Formation: 2011; 15 years ago
- Founders: Clyde Campbell; Greg Campbell
- Type: Non-for-profit organisation
- Purpose: Promote and fund Parkinson's research
- Region served: Australia
- Method: Donations, grants
- Key people: Clyde Campbell (chairman); Graeme Fear (vice chairman)
- Website: shakeitup.org.au

The Shake It Up Australia Foundation (SIUAF) is an Australian non-for-profit foundation founded in 2011 by Clyde and Greg Campbell. It is partnered with the Michael J. Fox Foundation (MJFF) to achieve the foundations primary aims of "promoting and funding Parkinson's disease research in Australia to slow, stop and cure the disease". Together MJFF and SIUAF are the largest non-government funders of Parkinson's research across multiple institutes in Australia. Since its founding, the foundation has co-founded 38 Parkinson's research projects across 12 institutes to the value of over $10.8 million. The foundation's funding model ensures that 100% of proceeds goes towards Parkinson's research in Australia. This is possible due to the founding directors covering all overhead costs and expenses. In January 2019, Shake It Up are one of the partner organisation in the Australian Parkinson's Mission which was awarded a $30 million-dollar grant to test repurposed drugs in clinical trials.

== Parkinson's disease ==
Parkinson's disease is a common neurological disease affecting 10 million people worldwide, with 38 Australian's being diagnosed each day. The disease is characterised by the loss of dopamine producing cells accompanied with chronic inflammation within the brain. It is caused by the loss of cells in various areas of the brain, significantly within the substantia nigia. Patients with Parkinson's, the loss dopamine producing neurons cause high levels of neuroinflamation to occur, mostly affecting the substantia nigra. When dopamine levels are depleted, the motor system nerves are unable to control movement and coordination. Over time, the dopamine producing cells are lost and motor type symptoms occur. People live with Parkinson's for a substantial amount of time before diagnosis when 80% of the dopamine producing cells are already lost. Currently there is no definitive test to diagnose Parkinson's but current clinical trials are showing promising results into ways to identify biomarkers that will detect the disease by a simple blood test at an earlier stage.

=== Signs and symptoms ===
The most recognisable symptoms are "motor related" however non-motor symptoms can consist of autonomic dysfunction, sleep difficulties, sensory such as altered sense of smell and neuropsychiatric problems (mood, cognition, behaviour or thought alterations).

Four motor symptoms are considered the primary sign by which a diagnosis for Parkinson's is made upon; Tremor, Slowness of movement (bradykinesia), postural instability and rigidity. The most common presenting symptoms of Parkinson's within patients is a slow coarse tremor which disappears during voluntary movement and in the deeper stages of sleep. It typically appears in one hand and affects both hands are the disease progresses.

== About Clyde ==
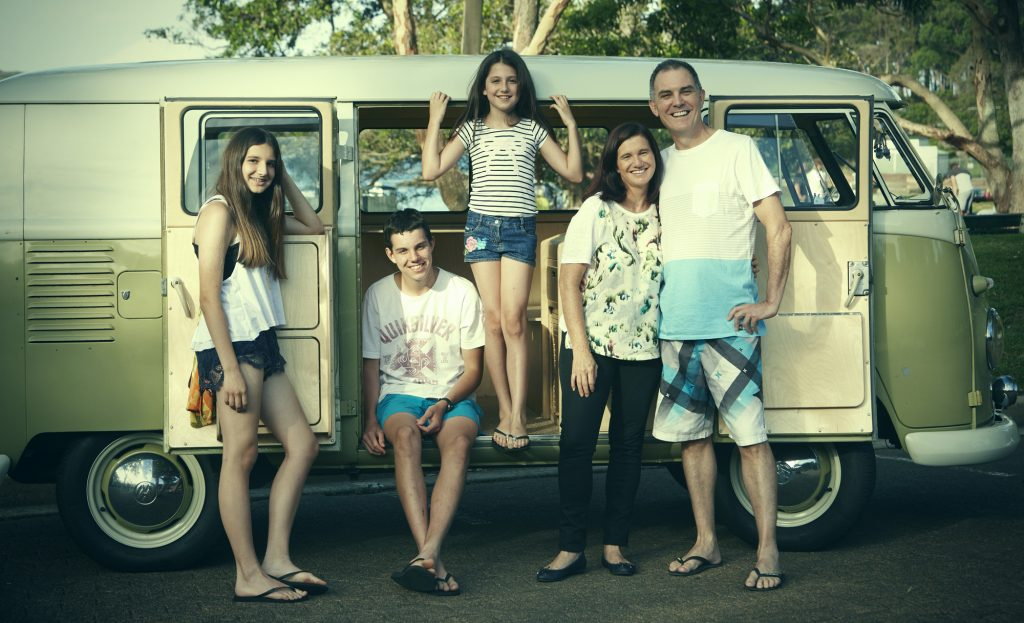
Clyde Campbell with wife Carolyn and three kids Josh (20), Zoe (18) and Phoebe (14)

Originally, from Northern New South Wales, Clyde lives in Northern Sydney with wife Carolyn and three kids Josh (20), Zoe (18) and Phoebe (14). Starting out Clyde was an electrical apprentice in NSW, which lead to him forming his own company in 1987, Machinery Automation and Robotics. This company grew to 70 staff which servicing Australian and International clients with high tech automation and robotic solutions. He had a vision for technology as a solution for problems and had a goal of making a difference to individual's lives.

Clyde in 2009, was diagnosed with Parkinson's disease after noticing a tremor in his left hand when holding notes at a company meeting. Clyde's faced the hardship of coming to terms with having an incurable disease that deteriorates progressively over time. After coming to terms with his prognosis, Clyde set out to learn as much about Parkinson's disease and what was being done in the worldwide effort to find a cure. This ensured his goal of finding a cure for Parkinson's.

He found that despite the multitude of foundations supporting Parkinson's research and Australia having some of the World's leading scientist's specialising in Parkinson's research, they required financial assistance to accelerate the research on a global scale. This launched the Shake It Up Australia Foundation to increase awareness in Australia and increase funding to Australian institutions to find a cure. His vision in establishing the foundation was to "create an opportunity for everyone in Australia to make a difference".

== Funding model ==
Shake it Up's funding model revolves around 100% of proceeds going towards funding research to cure Parkinson's disease, with the founders Clyde and Greg Campbell covering all overhead cost and expenses of the foundation. It was a decision made by the awareness of the limited resources available in a competitive market and the need for funds allocated to non-for-profit and social sector to be managed efficiently to accelerate the path to a cure. It has funded over $10.8 million into Australian institutions for research.

=== Government funding ===
In January 2019, the NSW federal government awarded a $36.8 million-dollar grant for Parkinson's medical research through the Australian Parkinson's Mission and Parkinson's nurses to help improve the lives of those diagnosed and find a way to slow, stop and cure the debilitating disease. This was achieved by the Australian Parkinson's Mission initiative, an international collaboration developed by the Garvan Institute of Medical Research, Shake It Up Australia Foundation, Parkinson's Australia, The Cure Parkinson's Trust and The Michael J. Fox Foundation for Parkinson's Research. It is an innovative research project combining clinical trials with genomics research for people with Parkinson's.

30 million dollars of the grant will be used to test repurposed drugs in a world's first in a Parkinson's clinical trial design by the Australian Parkinson's Mission, to identify effective safe treatments and fast track them to patients. Associate Professor Antony Cooper of the Garvan Institute of Medical Research will lead the research program. The mission will sequence the genome of each patient, to identify the unknown causes, discover biomarkers and determine whether there are Parkinsons's subtypes that can be targeted with specific drugs. Head of the Neurodegeneration and Neurogenomics Program at the Garvan Institute, said that the mission would be the "first step towards personalised medicine for Parkinson's patients" and further drug discovery. Its first clinical trial will assign 300 patients to randomly receive medication for existing conditions.

The further 6.8 was given to Primary Health Networks over the next four years from 2019, to ease access to specialist nurses in the community for people with movement disorders including Parkinson's disease.

== Partnership with The Michael J. Fox Foundation ==
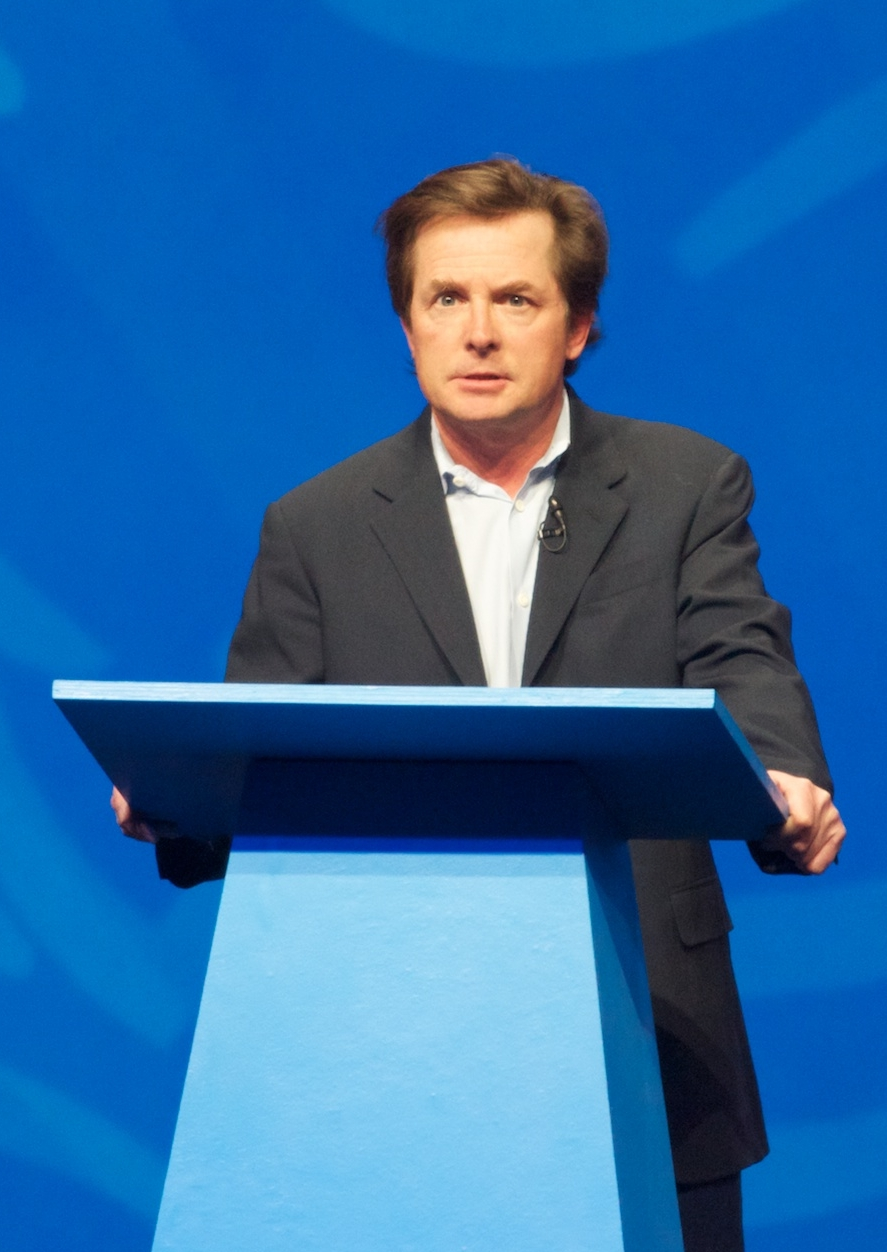
Michael J. Fox (Diagnosed with Parkinson's at age 29, in 1991)

Clyde's goal of finding a cure for Parkinson's led him to the Michael J. Fox Foundation for Parkinson's Research in the USA and the work they do to fund medical research targeted at finding better treatments, and a cure. In 2011, the Shake It Up Australia Foundation established a collaboration with the Michael J. Fox Foundation. This leveraged MJFF's Parkinson's drug development to Australia.

The Michael J. Fox Foundation was founded in 2000 by actor Michael J Fox, funding more than $800 million in research to date. MJFF approach of assessing, funding and project managing research globally eliminates redundancy, ensures efficiency and unites the global community to find a cure. This collaboration builds a strong foundation for promising research. The partnership allows the Shake it Up Foundation to be internationally competitive and strategically managed. It allows both parties to maximise capital raised from the Australian Parkinson's community to accelerate better research and treatments to slow, stop and cure the disease.

== Research projects ==
SIUAF and MJFF fund strategic, non-redundant and internationally competitive research projects. They have funded 38 research projects, within 12 different institutions since starting out in 2011. All research projects are assessed and validated by a panel of expert scientists at the Michael J. Fox Foundation to eliminate redundancy globally. Once the projects are approved, they are monitored and benchmarked by a team of PhD's and business trained project managers. Listed below are research projects that have been funded or are currently being funded by the Shake It Up Australia Foundation which have shown positive outcomes to slow, stop and cure Parkinson's disease:

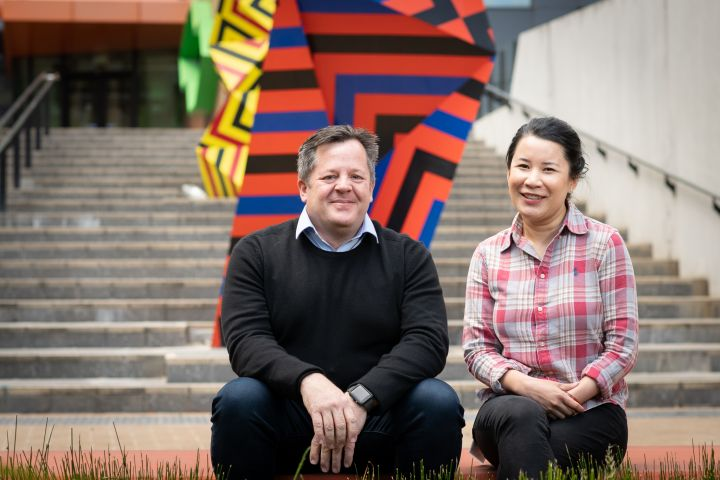
Professor Andrew Hill and Lesley Chang at La Trobe University

=== Biomarker's research at La Trobe University ===
Shake it Up committed funding to Professor Andrew Hill and Dr Lesley Cheng at La Trobe University to test the power of extracellular vesicles or cell particles, to detect Parkinson's via a simple blood test. The biological clue the test is looking for relates to the bloods 'appetite' for blood, as patient's with Parkinson's disease have white blood cells which consumes oxygen four times faster than normal cells. They are assessing whether this biomarker can be collected to determine a patient's neurological status. Researchers used blood samples from The Australian Parkinson's Disease Registry to determine whether biomarkers could be detected in both early onset and advanced patients who have taken medication for upwards of 5 years. Human trials of this test, which picks up on a key biological biomarker found in the blood of Parkinson's patients, delivered a 95% accuracy rate.

La Trobe's development of the world's-first diagnostic blood test is labelled by Parkinson's patients and scientists as a "medical breakthrough" in the SMH. Professor Fisher stated that the test's early diagnosis and treatment abilities will provide "better outcomes and a greater quality of life for people with the condition". A definitive diagnostic test will enable early intervention, limiting the number of brain cells and dopamine levels lost before one's diagnosis. La Trobe's research team estimates that the diagnostic blood test could be available within the next five years if additional funding is provided to speed up the development of the trial.

=== Inflammation study at the University of Queensland ===
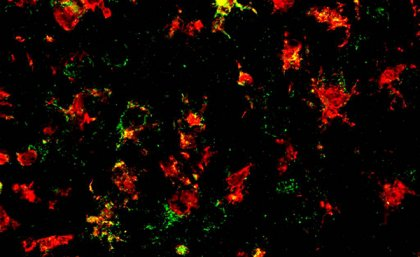
The NLRP3 inflammasome (green) is expressed by immune cells (red) in the brains of people with Parkinson's disease.

The inflammasome study conducted at the University of Queensland produced a promising new therapy to stop Parkinson's disease progressing through counteracting brain inflammation caused by immune cells. The study primarily targeting ways to counteract immune cells, specifically the microglia which is highly activated in patients with Parkinson's disease by NLRP3 inflammasome. The NLRP3 inflammasome reacts to synuclein containing protein clumps by increasing inflammatory signals which contributes to the depletion of dopamine producing cells within the brain. Whilst, recruiting more pathological proteins to create an intense cycle of neuroinflammation and a synuclein buildup within the brain. The study found that a small molecule MCC950 administered orally once a day, stopped the development of Parkinson's disease in several animal models. It was found to block NLRP3 activation within the brain and prevent both the loss of dopamine producing brain cells and neuroinflammation, resulting in significantly improved motor function - the leading symptom of parkinson's disease. UQ Bioscience researcher Professor Matt Cooper stated that the "MCC950 molecule effectively 'cooled the brains on fire', turning down microglial inflammatory activity, and allowing neurons to function normally."

Currently, there are no medications on the market that prevent brain cell loss in Parkinson's patients. Current therapies focus on managing symptoms rather than halting the progression of the degenerative disease. The promising results from this study validate a promising new target for Parkinson's researcher's and therapeutics to substantiate a potential drug to stop the progression of Parkinson's disease. The drug is now being commercialised for clinical trials by inflamzone, a pioneering biotech company that develops several small molecule drugs that inhibit harmful inflammation within the brain. With the success and extensive research studies taken place to ensure the drug is safe, tolerable and efficacious, human trials of the drug is now attainable. Phase 1 of the clinical trials on healthy volunteers is expected to start in 2019, with phase 2 trials on Parkinson's patient's predicted to take place in 2020 dependent on the results of Phase 1.
