= Multifactorial =

Multifactorial (having many factors) can refer to:

- The multifactorial in mathematics.
- Multifactorial inheritance, a pattern of predisposition for a disease process.
- Multifactorial disease
