= Mischel =

Mischel is a given name and surname. Notable people with the surname include:

- Paul Mischel (born 1962), American physician-scientist
- Walter Mischel (1930–2018), Austrian-born American psychologist
- Mischel Kwon (fl. 1980), American cybersecurity executive and public official

== See also ==
- Michel (name)
