= Steve Horvath =

German–American aging researcher, geneticist and biostatistician

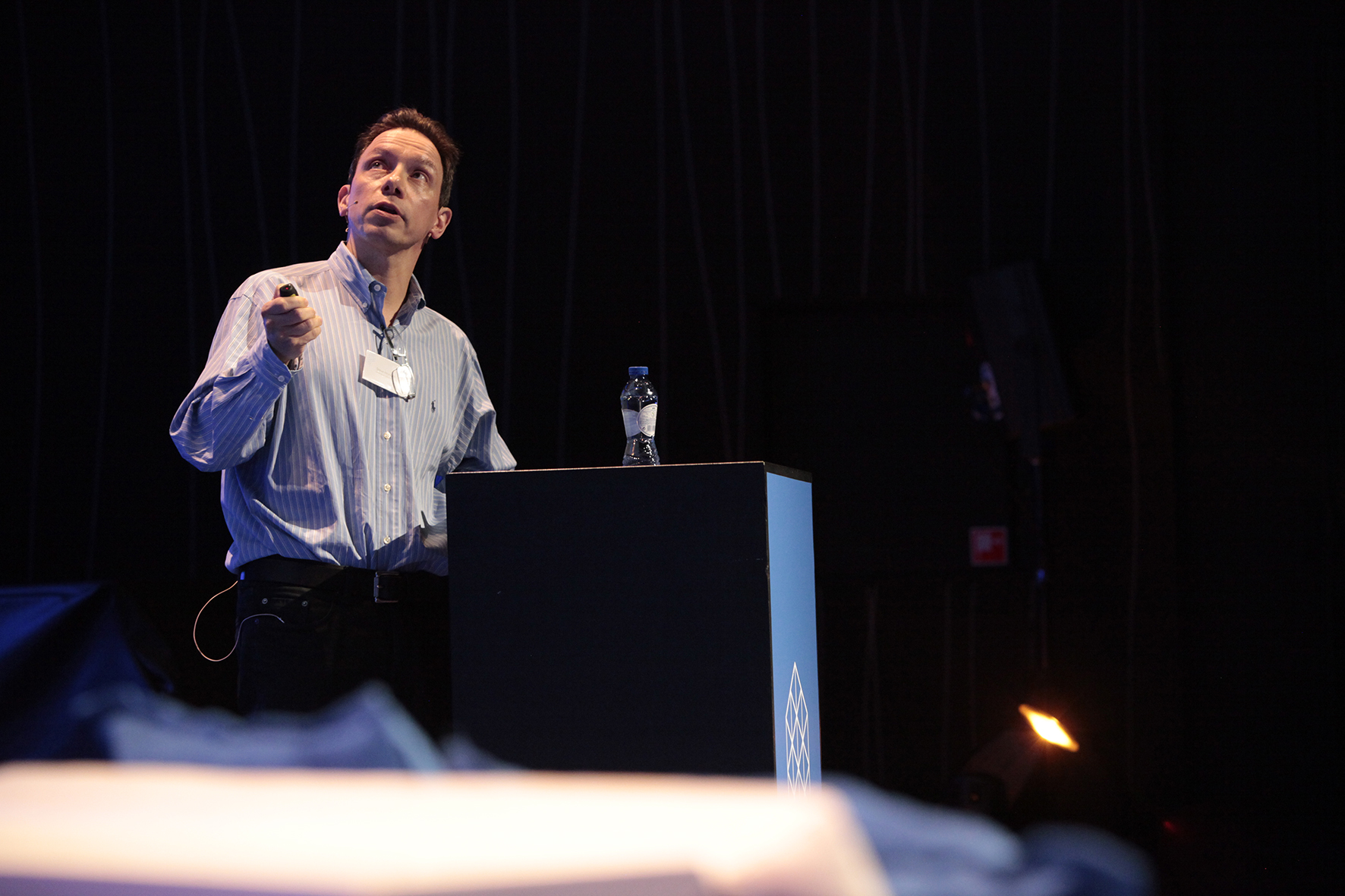
- Horvath presenting a talk in 2015
- Born: Frankfurt, Germany
- Occupations: Professor of Human Genetics & Biostatistics
- Known for: Developing the epigenetic clock (Horvath clock) and weighted correlation network analysis

Academic background
- Education: Technische Universität Berlin (BS); University of North Carolina, Chapel Hill (PhD); Harvard School of Public Health (Sc.D)
- Doctoral advisor: Robert Brown Gardner; Nan Laird

Steve Horvath is a German–American aging researcher, geneticist, and biostatistician. He is a professor at the University of California, Los Angeles. He is known for developing the Horvath aging clock, which is a highly accurate molecular biomarker of aging, and for developing weighted correlation network analysis. His work on the genomic biomarkers of aging, the aging process, and many age related diseases/conditions has earned him several research awards. Horvath is a principal investigator at the anti-aging startup Altos Labs and co-founder of nonprofit Clock Foundation.

== Background ==
Horvath was born 1967 in Frankfurt, Germany; as the family name Horvath indicates, he is of Hungarian ancestry. He received his Diplom in Mathematics and Physics at Technische Universität Berlin, graduating in 1989. He received his Ph.D. in mathematics at the UNC Chapel Hill in 1995 and his Sc.D. in biostatistics at Harvard in 2000. In 2000, Horvath joined the faculty of the University of California, Los Angeles, where he is a professor of human genetics at the David Geffen School of Medicine at UCLA and of biostatistics at the UCLA Fielding School of Public Health.

== Work on the epigenetic clock ==
Horvath's development of the DNA methylation based age estimation method known as epigenetic clock was featured in Nature magazine. In 2011, Horvath co-authored the first article that described an age estimation method based on DNA methylation levels from saliva. In 2013 Horvath published a single author article on a multi-tissue age estimation method that applies to all nucleated cells, tissues, and organs. This discovery, known as the Horvath clock, was unexpected because cell types differ in terms of their DNA methylation patterns and age related DNA methylation changes tend to be tissue specific. In his article, he demonstrated that estimated age, also referred to as DNA methylation age, has the following properties: it is close to zero for embryonic and induced pluripotent stem cells, it correlates with cell passage number; it gives rise to a highly heritable measure of age acceleration; and it is applicable to chimpanzees. Since the Horvath clock allows one to contrast the ages of different tissues from the same individuals, it can be used to identify tissues that show evidence of increased or decreased age.

=== Age related conditions and phenotypes ===
Horvath co-authored the first articles demonstrating that DNA methylation age predicts life-expectancy and is positively associated with obesity, HIV infection, Alzheimer's disease, cognitive decline, Huntington's disease, early menopause, and Werner syndrome.

=== Mammalian Methylation Studies ===
In 2017, Horvath started the Mammalian Methylation Consortium using a grant from the Paul G. Allen Foundation. In 2023, Steve Horvath and his team at the University of California, Los Angeles published the universal pan-mammalian epigenetic clocks capable of estimating age across all mammalian species. They also developed epigenetic predictors of maximum mammalian lifespan, gestation time, and other life-history traits, demonstrating that conserved DNA methylation patterns encode key species specific biological characteristics. In 2024, Horvath and colleagues further proposed fundamental equations linking methylation dynamics to maximum lifespan in mammals, providing a theoretical framework for understanding how epigenetic aging rates scale with species lifespan.

=== Genetics of epigenetic aging ===
Horvath published the first article demonstrating that trisomy 21 (Down syndrome) is associated with strong epigenetic age acceleration effects in both blood and brain tissue. Using genome-wide association studies, Horvath's team identified the first genetic markers (SNPs) that exhibit genome-wide significant associations with epigenetic aging rates – in particular, the first genome-wide significant genetic loci associated with epigenetic aging rates in blood notably the telomerase reverse transcriptase gene (TERT) locus. As part of this work, his team uncovered a paradoxical relationship: genetic variants associated with longer leukocyte telomere length in the TERT gene paradoxically confer higher epigenetic age acceleration in blood.

=== Work in biodemography ===
Horvath proposed that slower epigenetic aging rates could explain the mortality advantage of women and the Hispanic mortality paradox.

=== Lifestyle factors and nutrition ===
Horvath published the first large scale study of the effect of lifestyle factors on epigenetic aging rates.

These cross sectional of epigenetic aging rates in blood confirm the conventional wisdom regarding the benefits of education, eating a high plant diet with lean meats, moderate alcohol consumption, physical activity and the risks associated with metabolic syndrome.

=== Epigenetic clock theory of aging ===
Horvath and Raj proposed an epigenetic clock theory of aging which views biological aging as an unintended consequence of both developmental programs and maintenance program, the molecular footprints of which give rise to DNA methylation age estimators. DNAm age is viewed as a proximal readout of a collection of innate ageing processes that conspire with other, independent root causes of aging, to the detriment of tissue function.

=== Additional DNA methylation clocks ===
Horvath and his UCLA team developed several widely used DNA methylation–based biomarkers for humans. These include the Skin and Blood Clock, designed for in vitro and tissue-specific studies. His team developed widely used second generation epigenetic clocks, i.e. DNA methylation based predictors of human mortality risk, including PhenoAge and GrimAge His team developed a methylation-based estimator of telomere length His team pioneered third generation epigenetic clocks that apply to multiple species at the same time including universal pan-mammalian epigenetic clocks capable of estimating age in all mammalian species based on cytosines in highly conserved stretches of DNA

== Weighted correlation network analysis ==
Horvath and members of his lab developed a widely used systems biological data mining technique known as weighted correlation network analysis. He published a book on weighted network analysis and genomic applications.

== Awards and honors ==
Horvath has won several awards for his work on the epigenetic clock.

- 2017 Allen Distinguished Investigator award for clock studies in vertebrates
- 2019 Open Philanthropy Project award for mechanistic studies of the epigenetic clock
- 2019 Schober Award for outstanding and innovative research in the field of ageing
- 2022 Nathan W. Shock Award
- 2022 Fellow of the American Statistical Association
- 2023 WNAR Outstanding Impact Award for Epigenetic Clocks and Weighted Correlation Network Analysis
- 2025 Lifetime Achievement Award. Mastering the Aging Clock. Global Longevity Summit, Geneva
- 2025 Doctor Honoris Causa. Hungarian University of Sports Science, Budapest
- 2026 Luminary Award from the Precision Medicine World Conference (PMWC) in recognition of his pioneering work on the epigenetic clock and contributions to precision aging and longevity.
