= Paul Mischel =

American physician-scientist (born 1962)

Paul Salomon Mischel
- Born: July 13, 1962 (age 64); Syracuse, NY, USA.
- Education: University of Pennsylvania (BA); Cornell University Medical College (MD)
- Known for: Extrachromosomal DNA in cancer (ecDNA)
- Relatives: Doborah Kado, M.D. Walter Mischel
- Awards: National Academy of Medicine Ernst W. Bertner Prize for Distinbuished Contributions to Cancer Research American Society for Clinical Investigation (President, 2010/2011) American Association of Physicians Fellow, American Association for the Advancement of Science
- Scientific career
- Fields: Cancer genetics and pathology
- Workplaces: Stanford University, University of California, San Diego, University of California, Los Angeles
- Website: Group Website PubMed Stanford Profile Google Scholar

Paul S. Mischel (born July 13, 1962) is a physician-scientist whose laboratory has made pioneering discoveries in the pathogenesis of human cancer.He is the Fortinet Founders Professor, Vice Chair for Research for the Department of Pathology, and Deputy Director of Translational Science and an Institute Scholar at Sarafan ChEM-H, Stanford University. Mischel leads Team eDyNAmiC of the Cancer Grand Challenges program, tackling the challenge of extrachromosomal DNA (ecDNA) in cancer development, progression, and therapeutic resistance. Their research is published in papers in Nature, Science, and Cell, and highlighted in a recent profile in Science Magazine, as well as being highlighted in the “Clinical Implications of Basic Research” section of the New England Journal of Medicine. Their work was also recently highlighted in The Economist Magazine.

== Career ==
Mischel was born on July 13, 1962. After losing his father to cancer, he became committed to a career in cancer research. He attended the University of Pennsylvania and received his M.D. from Cornell University Medical College in 1991, graduating Alpha Omega Alpha. Mischel completed residency training in Anatomic Pathology and Neuropathology at UCLA, followed by post-doctoral research training with Louis Reichardt at HHMI-UCSF. Mischel joined the faculty of UCLA in 1998. In August 2012, he was recruited to the Ludwig Institute for Cancer Research, San Diego and UCSD. In 2021, he joined Stanford University School of Medicine, where he currently serves as a Professor and Vice Chair of Research for the Department of Pathology, and is also Deputy Director of Translational Science and an Institute Scholar at Sarafan ChEM-H, Stanford University. Mischel leads team eDyNAmiC of the Cancer Grand Challenges program.

== Research ==
Genes are passed on chromosomes from parents to children and from mother cells to daughter cells when they divide, including in cancer. However, extensive tumor cell to tumor cell variability and rapid genome change of some cancers calls this assumption into question. Mischel set out to ask where genes are amplified in cancer. Resurrecting a discovery made over 60 years ago, but incompletely understood, he discovered the critical importance for extrachromosomal DNA (ecDNA) in cancer. Deploying the tools of modern molecular biology and cell biology, to decipher ecDNAs and how they function, he demonstrated that ecDNAs are circular, double stranded, chromatinized DNA, often of 1-5 milion base pairs enriched for oncogenes, immunomodulatory genes, and gene regulatory elements. With colleagues, including Howard Chang, he showed they can be transforming and demonstrated how their altered structure generates new forms of long-range gene regulation, rewiring epigenetic structure, and driving massive oncogene transcription. These discoveries have enhanced the fundamental understanding of the molecular basis of nearly 20% of all cancers, opening a new field, promising new treatments targeting genes and proteins involved in this unique biology, demonstrating the importance of non-Mendelian inheritance of oncogenes in cancer development and treatment resistance.

== Honors ==
Mischel is a member of the National Academy of Medicine, a Fellow of the AACR Academy, and recipient of the Ernst W. Bertner Memorial Award from MD Anderson for Distinguished Contributions to Cancer Research. Mischel is also an elected Fellow and Past-President of the American Society for Clinical Investigation, and an elected Fellow of the American Association of Physicians and The American Association for the Advancement of Science.

== Personal life ==
Mischel is married to Professor Deborah Kado, Chief of Geriatrics Research, co-director of the Stanford Longevity Center, and Director of the Palo Alto VA Geriatrics Research, Education, and Clinical Center. They have two daughters, Dr. Anna Mischel and Dr. Sarah Mischel. Paul is the son of the cognitive philosopher Theodore Mischel and the nephew of the famed psychologist, Walter Mischel.

== News articles and external links ==
Team eDyNAmiC: Following the science and accelerating our understanding of ecDNA

Cracking the code of DNA circles in cancer, Stanford Medicine-led team uncovers potential therapy

Study raises hopes of treating aggressive cancers by zapping rogue DNA

The cartographer of cancer

Coming full circle with extrachromosomal DNA, cancer and Ptolemy

Cancers cheat during mitosis to pass on their most malignant genes
