= Edo Ronald de Kloet =

Dutch neuroendocrinologist (born 1944)

- Born: August 19, 1944 (age 82); Maarssen
- Education: Utrecht University
- Known for: MR:GR balance hypothesis
- Awards: Knight of the Order of the Netherlands Lion (2010); Neuropsychopharmacology Award, European College of Neuropsychopharmacology (2007)
- Scientific career
- Fields: Neuroendocrinology Pharmacology
- Workplaces: Royal Netherlands Academy of Arts and Sciences; Leiden University; Utrecht University; Rockefeller University
- Doctoral advisor: David de Wied

Edo Ronald de Kloet (born August 19, 1944) is a Dutch neuroendocrinologist and Academy Professor of the Royal Netherlands Academy of Arts and Sciences and Emeritus Professor at Leiden University. He is a highly productive and cited researcher, known for his work on the neuroendocrinology of stress and adaptation.

== Education ==
Edo Ronald (Ron) de Kloet studied biochemistry at Utrecht University, where he completed his doctoral training in 1972 under the supervision of David de Wied. His PhD research focused on the central actions of corticosteroid hormones, laying the groundwork for his lifelong interest in neuroendocrinology and stress biology.

He subsequently undertook postdoctoral training with Bruce McEwen at Rockefeller University (1973–1974), where he helped demonstrate that synthetic glucocorticoids such as dexamethasone differ fundamentally from endogenous corticosteroids in their access to the brain and receptor activation.

== Academic career ==
de Kloet began his academic career at the Rudolf Magnus Institute in Utrecht, serving as Associate Professor of Neuropharmacology. In 1990, he was appointed Professor of Medical Pharmacology at the Leiden Academic Centre for Drug Research (LACDR), a joint institute of Leiden University and the Leiden University Medical Center (LUMC). The research within the Department of Medical Pharmacology was led by de Kloet as a joint effort with the faculty staff: Menno Kruk, Melly Oitzl, Erno Vreugdenhil, Roel de Rijk, Nicole Datson and Onno Meijer.

From 2005, he is an academy professor of the Royal Netherlands Academy of Arts and Sciences. Following his 2009 retirement, he became an emeritus professor at LACDR, Leiden University and the Department of Endocrinology & Metabolism, LUMC, Leiden, The Netherlands. Throughout his career, de Kloet led internationally recognized research programs focused on the neuroendocrinology of stress.

De Kloet has mentored a generation of scientists who have gone on to lead major research programs in endocrinology, neuroscience, pharmacology and psychiatry, including Peter Burbach, Johannes Reul, Onno Meijer, Marcel Schaaf, Alexa Veenema, Mathias Schmidt, Rixt van der Veen, Alessandra Berry, and Nikolaos Daskalakis

== Research contributions ==
De Kloet's most influential contributions center on the "Yin-Yang" dual-action of corticosteroid hormones in the brain:

- Dual receptor model: In 1985, de Kloet and colleagues demonstrated that stress hormones act through two distinct receptor systems: the high-affinity mineralocorticoid receptor (MR) and the lower-affinity glucocorticoid receptor (GR).
- MR:GR balance hypothesis: He proposed that the balance between MR (which controls the threshold of the stress response) and GR (which manages recovery and adaptation) is essential for mental health. Imbalance in these systems is a key driver of vulnerability to depression and PTSD.
- Early-life programming: De Kloet has conducted extensive research into how early-life environment and cortisol exposure "program" the brain. His work demonstrates that stressors in early development can lead to permanent changes in receptor expression and HPA-axis regulation, creating a lifelong vulnerability or resilience to stress-related illness.

== Honors and awards ==
Ron de Kloet has received numerous international honors, including:

- Emil Kraepelin Guest Professorship, Max Planck Institute of Psychiatry (1998)
- Professorship, Royal Netherlands Academy of Arts and Sciences (2004)
- Geoffrey Harris (neuroendocrinologist) Award, European Society of Endocrinology (2005)
- Neuropsychopharmacology Award, European College of Neuropsychopharmacology (ECNP) (2007)
- Bruce McEwen Lifetime Achievement Award, International Society of Psychoneuroendocrinology (ISPNE) (2008)
- Knight of the Order of the Netherlands Lion (2010)
- Golden Emil Kraepelin Medal, Max Planck Institute of Psychiatry (2014)
- Pioneer Award (shared with Marian Joëls), Global Stress & Resilience Network (2024)

== See also ==
- Hypothalamic–pituitary–adrenal axis
- Stress (biology)
- Neuroendocrinology
- Glucocorticoid receptor
- Mineralocorticoid receptor
