= Heather Cameron =

Heather Cameron may refer to:

- Heather Cameron (character) (a.k.a Lifeguard), a Marvel Comics superhero
- Heather A. Cameron, American neuroscientist
- Heather Cameron (professor), Canadian and British social theorist and social entrepreneur
