= Velma McBride Murry =

American psychologist and sociologist

- Education: University of Tennessee, BS (1974); University of Missouri, MS (1985); University of Missouri, PhD (1987)
- Scientific career
- Fields: Adolescent Psychology
- Workplaces: Vanderbilt University
- Thesis: Family stress: Change in demands and capabilities (1987)

Velma McBride Murry is an American psychologist and sociologist, currently the Lois Autrey Betts Chair in Education and Human Development and Joe B. Wyatt Distinguished University Professor at Vanderbilt University. Her research has largely focused on resilience and protective factors for African-American families, and she has several publications in this area. In addition to her empirical research, she has contributed to several published books and used her experience to create two family-based preventative intervention programs.

== Early life and education ==
McBride Murry was raised in Medon, Tennessee. McBride Murry attended the University of Tennessee for her undergraduate studies, where she received a Bachelor's degree in 1974. Following her undergraduate studies, she worked with elementary school teachers and students in Memphis, Tennessee where she became interested in child psychology and development. She then attended University of Missouri-Columbia with her husband, Acie C. Murry Jr. There, she received her Master's degree in 1985 and her Doctorate in 1987, with her work during that time mostly focusing on family stress.

== Career and research ==
Following her doctoral research, McBride Murry became an assistant professor at the University of Connecticut within the School of Family Studies and then moved to Athens, Georgia to become an assistant professor at the University of Georgia. There, her research program centered on studies to understand how successful families and communities help children succeed. From 1995 to 2008, she served as co-director of the Center for Family Research with Gene Brody. Together, they co-developed the Strong African American Families program in 2000, which provided educational interventions to reduce adolescent substance abuse and high-risk behaviors in adolescents. The program is intended to promote successful parenting strategies for adults and good decision-making for their children. Youth who participate in the program demonstrate fewer conduct problems, are less likely to begin using drugs, and report delayed onset of sexual behavior, and these impacts can still be seen in a majority of participants 29 months after completing the program. Further, maternal depression and positive racial identity are improved through the program.

In 2008, McBride Murry moved to Vanderbilt University, where she became a professor in the Department of Human and Organizational Development and the Lois Audrey Betts chair in education and human development. There, she developed the Pathways for African American Success (PAAS) program, leveraging technology to create and disseminate interventions for children and their caregivers. Studies comparing technology-based PAAS programs, particularly when addressing the digital divide that often exists for rural African-American families, found that youth in technology conditions reported significantly reduced risky behaviors when compared to control groups. The program is designed in part to address HIV infection rates, which are comparatively higher among rural African American communities in the United States, by increasing access to reliable information across these communities. PAAS also reports promotion of academic success as well as prevention of aggressive behavior, substance use, and other risky behaviors.

== Notable works ==
=== Chapters written or contributed to ===
- Physical Health. Black Adolescence: Current Issues and Annotated Bibliography (1990)
- Inner-city Girls of Color: Unmarried, Sexually Active Nonmothers. Urban Girls: Resisting Stereotypes, Creating Identities (1996)
- Variation in Adolescent Pregnancy Status: A National Tri-Ethnic Study. Resiliency in African-American Families. (1998)
- Racial socialization processes in single-mother families: Linking maternal racial identity, parenting, and racial socialization in rural, single-mother families with child self-worth and self-regulation. Black Children: Social, Educational, and Parental Environments, 2nd edition. (2002)
- Sociocultural Contexts of African American Families. African American Family Life: Ecological and Cultural Diversity. (2005)
- College Professors' Conversations About Teaching Family Theories. Sourcebook of Family Theory & Research. (2005)
- Contextual Processes of Romantic Relationships: Plausible Explanations for Gender and Race Effects. Romance and Sex in Adolescence and Emerging Adulthood: Risks and Opportunities. (2006)
- Ecological and sociocultural determinants of risk and health-promoting behaviors among African American youth. African American Children and Mental Health, Vols 1 and 2: Development and Context; Prevention and Social Policy. (2011)
- Family-based HIV Prevention with African American and Hispanic Youth. Family and HIV/AIDs: Cultural and Contextual Issues in PReventions and Treatment. (2012)
- Gender and Family Relations. Handbook of Marriage and the Family, 3rd edition. (2013)
- Children in Diverse Social Contexts. Handbook of Child Psychology and Developmental Science: Ecological Settings and Processes, Volume 4, 7th edition. (2015)
- Adjustment and developmental patterns of African American males: The roles of families, communities, and other contexts. Boys and Men in African American Families. (2016)
- Rural African American adolescents' development: A critical review of empirical studies and preventive intervention programs. Rural Ethnic Minority Youth and Families in the United States: Theory, Research, and Applications. (2016)
- Rural youth development: Theoretical perspectives, challenges, and protective processes. APA Handbook of Adolescent and Young Adult Development. (2023)

=== Journal publications ===
- Murry, V. M. (1994). Black adolescent females: A comparison of early versus coital initiators. Family Relations: An Interdisciplinary Journal of Applied Family Studies, 43(3), 342–348. https://doi.org/10.2307/585427
- Murry, V. M. (1995). An ecological analysis of pregnancy resolution decisions among African American and Hispanic adolescent females. Youth & Society, 26(3), 325–350. https://doi.org/10.1177/0044118X95026003003
- Murry, V. M., & Brody, G. H. (1999). Self-regulation and self-worth of Black children reared in economically stressed, rural, single mother-headed families: The contribution of risk and protective factors. Journal of Family Issues, 20(4), 458–484. https://doi.org/10.1177/019251399020004003
- Murry, V. M., Bynum, M. S., Brody, G. H., Willert, A., & Stephens, D. (2001). African American single mothers and children in context: A review of studies on risk and resilience. Clinical Child and Family Psychology Review, 4(2), 133–155. https://doi.org/10.1023/A:1011381114782
- Brody, G. H., Ge, X., Conger, R., Gibbons, F. X., McBride Murry, V., Gerrard, M., & Simons, R. L. (2001). The influence of neighborhood disadvantage, collective socialization, and parenting on African American children's affiliation with deviant peers. Child Development, 72(4), 1231–1246. https://doi.org/10.1111/1467-8624.00344
- Murry, V. M., Brown, P. A., Brody, G. H., Cutrona, C. E., & Simons, R. L. (2001). Racial discrimination as a moderator of the links among stress, maternal psychological functioning, and family relationships. Journal of Marriage and Family, 63(4), 915–926. https://doi.org/10.1111/j.1741-3737.2001.00915.x
- Brody, G. H., McBride Murry, V., Kim, S., & Brown, A. C. (2002). Longitudinal pathways to competence and psychological adjustment among African American children living in rural single-parent households. Child Development, 73(5), 1505–1516. https://doi.org/10.1111/1467-8624.00486
- Brody, G. H., Murry, V. M., Gerrard, M., Gibbons, F. X., Molgaard, V., McNair, L., Brown, A. C., Wills, T. A., Spoth, R. L., Luo, Z., Chen, Y., & Neubaum-Carlan, E. (2004). The Strong African American Families Program: Translating research into prevention programming. Child Development, 75(3), 900–917. https://doi.org/10.1111/j.1467-8624.2004.00713.x
- Brody, G. H., Murry, V. M., McNair, L., Chen, Y.-F., Gibbons, F. X., Gerrard, M., & Wills, T. A. (2005). Linking Changes in Parenting to Parent-Child Relationship Quality and Youth Self-Control: The Strong African American Families Program. Journal of Research on Adolescence, 15(1), 47–69. https://doi.org/10.1111/j.1532-7795.2005.00086.x
- Brody, G. H., Murry, V. M., Gerrard, M., Gibbons, F. X., McNair, L., Brown, A. C., Wills, T. A., Molgaard, V., Spoth, R. L., Luo, Z., & Chen, Y.-F. (2006). The Strong African American Families Program: Prevention of youths’ high-risk behavior and a test of a model of change. Journal of Family Psychology, 20(1), 1–11. https://doi.org/10.1037/0893-3200.20.1.1
- Brody, G. H., Chen, Y.-F., Murry, V. M., Ge, X., Simons, R. L., Gibbons, F. X., Gerrard, M., & Cutrona, C. E. (2006). Perceived Discrimination and the Adjustment of African American Youths: A Five-Year Longitudinal Analysis With Contextual Moderation Effects. Child Development, 77(5), 1170–1189. https://doi.org/10.1111/j.1467-8624.2006.00927.x
- Murry, V. M., Berkel, C., Brody, G. H., Gibbons, M., & Gibbons, F. X. (2007). The Strong African American Families Program: Longitudinal pathways to sexual risk reduction. Journal of Adolescent Health, 41(4), 333–342. https://doi.org/10.1016/j.jadohealth.2007.04.003
- Murry, V. M., Heflinger, C. A., Suiter, S. V., & Brody, G. H. (2011). Examining perceptions about mental health care and help-seeking among rural African American families of adolescents. Journal of Youth and Adolescence, 40(9), 1118–1131. https://doi.org/10.1007/s10964-010-9627-1
- Murry, V. M., Butler, B. S. T., Mayo, G. T. L., & Inniss, T. M. N. (2018). Excavating new constructs for family stress theories in the context of everyday life experiences of Black American families. Journal of Family Theory & Review, 10(2), 384–405. https://doi.org/10.1111/jftr.12256
- Murry, V. M., Berkel, C., Inniss-Thompson, M. N., & Debreaux, M. L. (2019). Pathways for African American success: Results of three-arm randomized trial to test the effects of technology-based delivery for rural African American families. Journal of Pediatric Psychology, 44(3), 375–387. https://doi.org/10.1093/jpepsy/jsz001
- Murry, V. M., Bradley, C., Cruden, G., Brown, C. H., Howe, G. W., Sepùlveda, M.-J., Beardslee, W., Hannah, N., & Warne, D. (2022). Re-envisioning, retooling, and rebuilding prevention science methods to address structural and systemic racism and promote health equity. Prevention Science. https://doi.org/10.1007/s11121-022-01439-4

== Awards and honors ==
- Elected Member, National Academy of Medicine, 2020
- Joe B. Wyatt Distinguished University Professor Award, Vanderbilt University, 2016
- Presidential Citation, American Psychological Association, 2014
- Elizabeth Hurlock Beckman Award, American Psychological Association, 2013
- Reuben Hill Award, National Council on Family Relations, 2006
