= Catherine Woolley =

Catherine Woolley may refer to:

- Catherine S. Woolley (born 1965) American neuroendocrinologist
- Jane Thayer (1904–2005), the pen name of American children's writer Catherine Woolley

== See also ==
- Katharine Woolley (1888–1945), British archaeologist
