= C4orf51 =

Protein-coding gene in the species Homo sapiens

Identifiers
- Aliases: C4orf51, chromosome 4 open reading frame 51
- External IDs: MGI: 1914937; HomoloGene: 78034; GeneCards: C4orf51; OMA:C4orf51 - orthologs

Gene location (Human)
Chr.	Chromosome 4 (human)
Band	4q31.21	Start	145,680,115 bp
Band	4q31.21	End	145,771,032 bp

Gene location (Mouse)
Chr.	Chromosome 8 (mouse)
Band	8|8 C1	Start	79,937,060 bp
Band	8|8 C1	End	79,975,199 bp
RNA expression pattern
Bgee	Human / Mouse (ortholog); Top expressed in: gonad; testicle; right testis; left testis; right uterine tube; granulocyte; human kidney; cerebellar hemisphere; right hemisphere of cerebellum; right adrenal cortex / Top expressed in: seminiferous tubule; spermatid; spermatocyte; blastocyst; embryo; embryo; islet of Langerhans; lip; genital tubercle; More reference expression data
BioGPS	n/a
Orthologs
Species	Human	Mouse
Entrez	646603	67687
Ensembl	ENSG00000237136	ENSMUSG00000031682
UniProt	C9J302	Q9DAF8
RefSeq (mRNA)	NM_001080531	NM_026315
RefSeq (protein)	NP_001074000	NP_080591
Location (UCSC)	Chr 4: 145.68 – 145.77 Mb	Chr 8: 79.94 – 79.98 Mb
PubMed search
- Wikidata
View/Edit Human	View/Edit Mouse

Chromosome 4 open reading frame 51 (C4orf51) is a protein which in humans is encoded by the C4orf51 gene.

== Gene ==
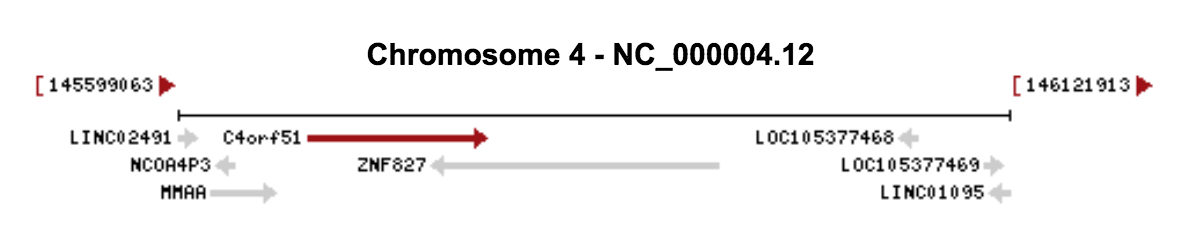
Genomic neighborhood of C4orf51, labeled in red.

The C4orf51 gene is located at 4q31.21 on the plus strand of chromosome 4. The gene spans 120,289 base pairs and contains 6 exons. The genomic neighborhood of C4orf51 includes LOC285422, LINC02491, NCOA4P3, and MMAA, all located upstream of C4orf51. ZNF827 and LOC105377468 are located downstream of C4orf51.

== mRNA ==
There are three known transcript variants for C4orf51, which encode for isoforms X1, X2, and X3. Though the variants vary in length, all contain exons 1 and 2. At times, C4orf51 is transcribed to form an mRNA corresponding to C4orf51 and the neighboring gene.

== Protein ==
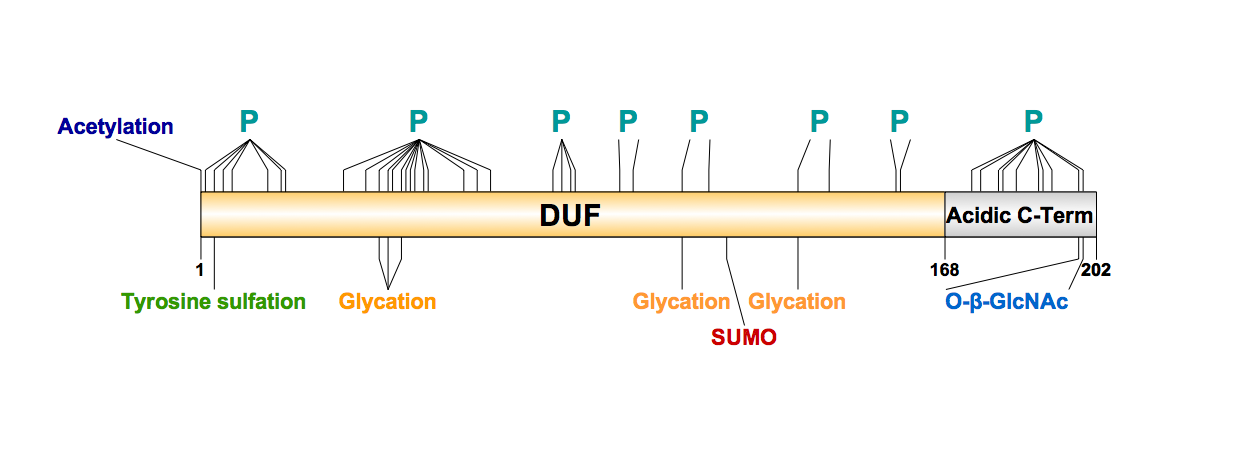
Schematic illustration of predicted post-translational modifications for C4orf51, made using DOG 2.0. DUF4722 shown.

C4orf51 encodes for a protein with 202 amino acids and a molecular weight of 23 kDa. The theoretical isoelectric point of C4orf51 is 8.6. Relative to other human proteins, C4orf51 has more serine resides and fewer valine residues.

=== Domains and motifs ===
In humans, the C4orf51 protein contains one domain of unknown function, DUF4722. DUF4722 spans the first 168 amino acids of C4orf51 and has a predicted molecular weight of 19.3 kDa. In a compositional analysis of this domain, no extremes were identified. The DUF is highly conserved in orthologous proteins, particularly near the N-terminus.

=== Secondary structure ===
Alpha-helices are predicted to span amino acids 20-34 and 150–165 in C4orf51. Amino acids 45 to 48 are predicted to form a beta sheet. No coils are predicted in C4orf51.

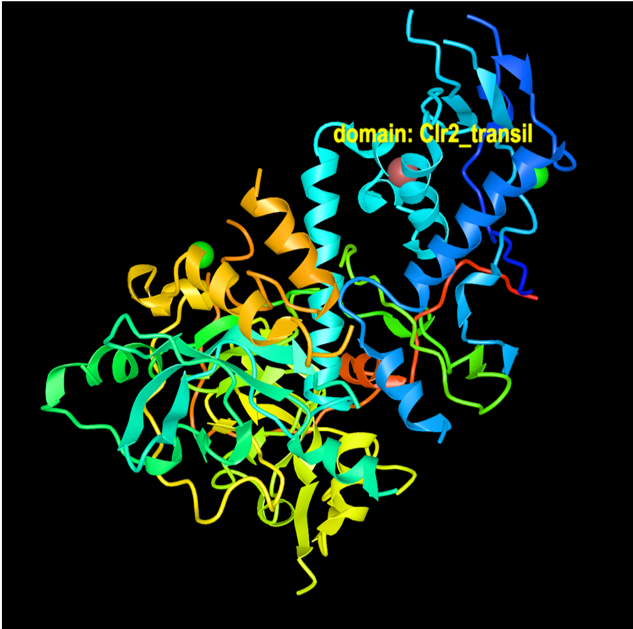
Structural analog of C4orf51, generated by I-TASSER and visualized with iCn3D. Conserved domain Clr2_transil, involved in transcriptional silencing, is labeled in yellow.

=== Tertiary and quaternary structure ===
The best-aligned structural analog of C4orf51, generated by I-TASSER, contains Clr2_transil, a domain involved in transcriptional silencing. Per Origene, migration of a C4orf51 rabbit polyclonal antibody in gel resulted in a band at 23 kDa and at ~44-46 kDa, suggesting that C4of51 may form a dimer.

=== Post-translational modifications ===
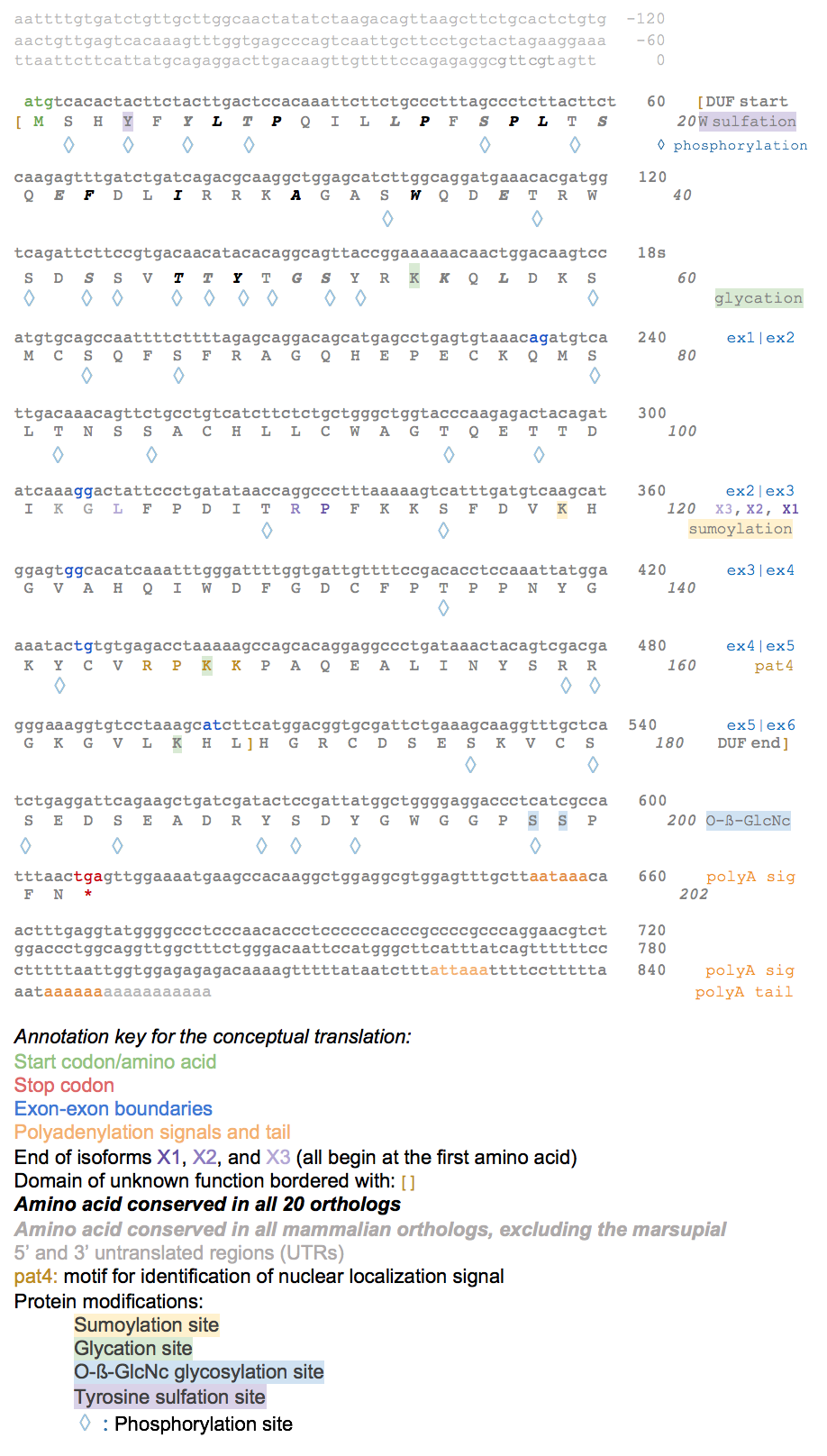
Conceptual translation of C4orf51, with annotation key below. Exon-exon boundaries, transcription start and stop sites, and predicted post-translational modifications are marked.

C4orf51 is predicted to undergo several post-translational modifications, including phosphorylation, glycation, and acetylation. Though SUMOylation and tyrosine sulfation are also predicted, the sites of these modifications are not conserved in distant C4orf51 orthologs.

=== Subcellular localization ===
C4orf51 is predicted to be localized to the cell nucleus. The protein contains pat4, a motif commonly used to identify potential nuclear localization signals. This motif is conserved in the most distantly related C4orf51 ortholog known, found in Anolis carolinensis.

== Expression ==
C4orf51 expression is low in all tissues, with the exception of the testes. However, because C4orf51 contains long-terminal repeats (LTRs) of human endogenous retroviruses (HERVs) in the gene body, it has exhibited high levels of expression in differentiation-defective human induced pluripotent stem cells.

=== Promoter ===
There are two promoter regions predicted by Genomatix, but only one (GXP_921944) is located upstream of the transcription start site. GXP_921944 spans 1910 base pairs on chromosome 4. There are 15 coding transcripts supporting this promoter, but none are experimentally verified.

== Interacting proteins ==
Experimentally-determined protein interactions for C4orf51 have not yet been identified.

== Clinical significance ==
Vlaikou et al. (2004) report that a 4q deletion containing C4orf51 and six other genes causes growth failure and developmental delay, minor craniofacial dysmorphism, digital anomalies, and cardiac and skeletal defects.

== Homology ==
=== Paralogs ===
No paralogs or paralogous domains exist for C4orf51.

=== Orthologs ===
Orthologs of C4orf51 have been found in mammals and reptiles. Within class Mammalia, orthologs have been identified in orders Primata, Scandentia, Lagomorpha, Rodentia, Perissodactyla, Chiroptera, Carnivora, Cetartiodactyla, Sirenia, and Proboscidea, as well as mammalian infraclass Marsupialia. The green anole (Anolis carolinensis) and Burmese python (Python bivittatus) contain the most distantly related orthologs of C4orf51. Both species diverged from humans an estimated 312 million years ago. C4orf51 orthologs have not yet been identified in bacteria, archaea, protists, plants, fungi, trichoplax, invertebrates, bony or cartilaginous fish, amphibians, or birds.

C4orf51 Orthologs
Genus and species	Common name	Taxonomic group	Estimated date of divergence	Accession number	Length (amino acids)	Sequence identity	Sequence similarity
Homo sapiens	Human	Mammalia (Primate)	0	NP_001074000.1	202	100.00%	100%
Macaca mulatta	Rhesus macaque	Mammalia (Primate)	29.44	NP_001181807.1	202	94.55%	97%
Callithrix jacchus	Common marmoset	Mammalia (Primate)	43.6	XP_008990874.1	217	79.72%	88%
Tupaia chinensis	Chinese tree shrew	Mammalia (Scandentia)	82	XP_006143532.1	201	68.96	77%
Oryctolagus cuniculus	European rabbit	Mammalia (Lagomorpha)	90	XP_017202803.1	222	57.40%	76%
Mus musculus	House mouse	Mammalia (Rodentia)	90	NP_080591.1	208	50.96%	66%
Urocitellus parryii	Arctic ground squirrel	Mammalia (Rodentia)	90	XP_026248522.1	142	43.35%	72%
Ceratotherium simum simum	Southern white rhinoceros	Mammalia (Perissodactyla)	96	XP_014635653.1	199	66.50%	77%
Equus asinus	Donkey	Mammalia (Perissodactyla)	96	XP_014693612.1	201	64.71%	75%
Pteropus vampyrus	Large flying fox	Mammalia (Chiroptera)	96	XP_023385935.1	200	62.56%	71%
Enhydra lutris kenyoni	Sea otter	Mammalia (Carnivora)	96	XP_022368037.1	201	61.39%	74%
Myotis brandtii	Brandt's bat	Mammalia (Chiroptera)	96	XP_014393999.1	199	59.11%	69%
Callorhinus ursinus	Northern fur seal	Mammalia (Carnivora)	96	XP_025730051.1	146	50.50%	68%
Vicugna pacos	Alpaca	Mammalia (Artiodactyla)	96	XP_006210007	158	50.50%	59%
Balaenoptera acutorostrata scammoni	Minke whale	Mammalia (Cetacea)	96	XP_007189508.1	168	49.51%	56%
Trichechus manatus latirostris	West Indian manatee	Mammalia (Sirenia)	105	XP_004378925.1	162	57.64%	66%
Loxodonta africana	African bush elephant	Mammalia (Proboscidea)	105	XP_023412869.1	213	53.00%	65%
Sarcophilus harrisii	Tasmanian devil	Mammalia (Marsupial)	159	XP_023361728.1	190	28.71%	52%
Anolis carolinensis	Green anole	Reptilia	312	XP_003221711.1	194	21.53%	46%
Python bivittatus	Burmese python	Reptilia	312	XP_025028520.1	176	19.43%	51%
