= Socioeconomic status =

Economic and social measure of a person's affluence and/or influence

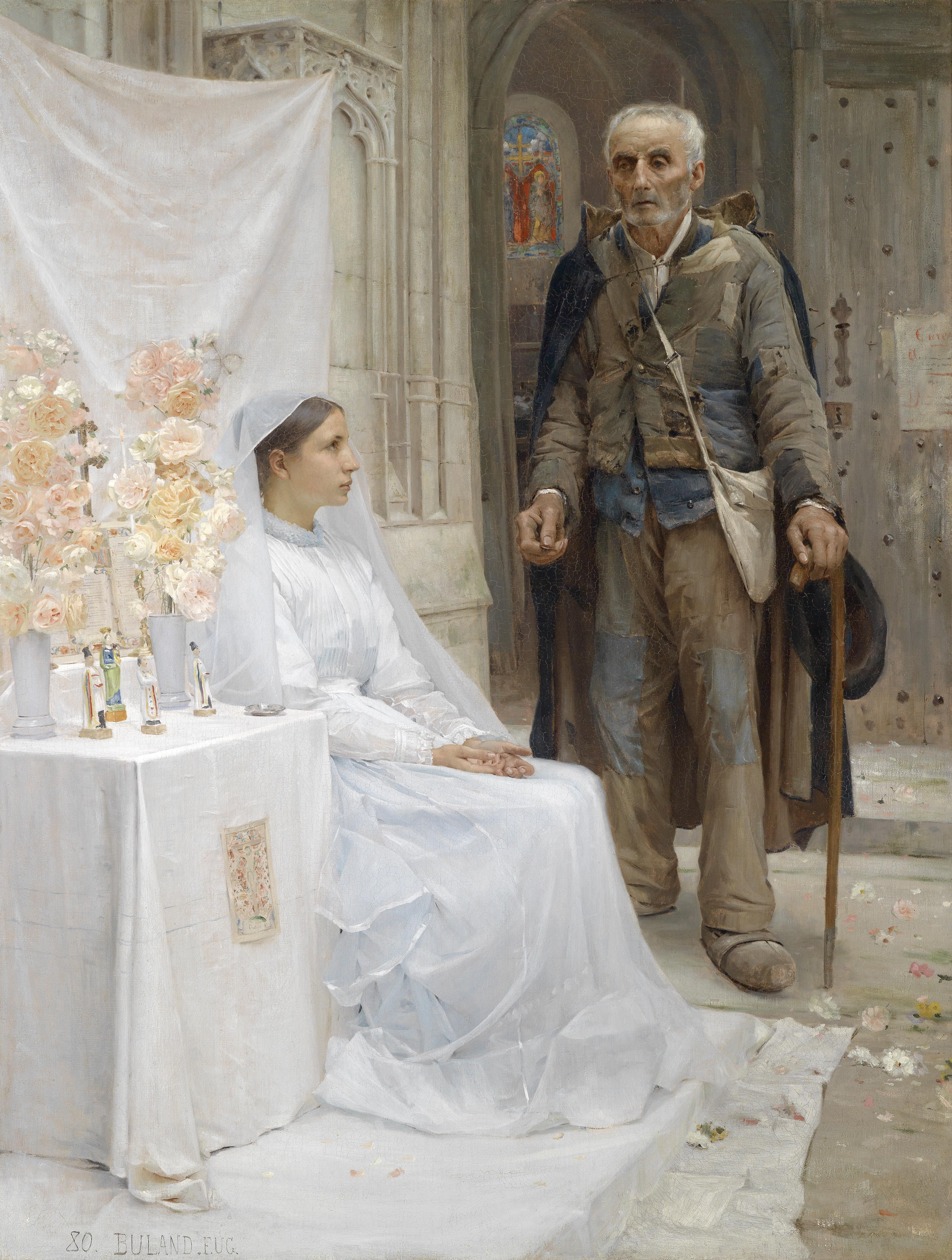
An 1880 painting by Jean-Eugène Buland showing a stark contrast in socioeconomic status

Socioeconomic status (SES) is a measurement used by economists and sociologists. The measurement combines a person's or their family's economic or wealth level and social position (generally determined by education level) in relation to others.

In common parlance, "socioeconomic status" is synonymous with social class. However, academics distinguish social class from socioeconomic status, using the former to refer to one's relatively stable cultural background and the latter to refer to one's current social and economic situation, which is consequently more changeable over time.

When analyzing a family's SES, the household income and the education and occupations of its members are examined, whereas for an individual's SES only their own attributes are assessed. Recently, research has revealed a lesser-recognized attribute of SES as perceived financial stress, as it defines the "balance between income and necessary expenses". Perceived financial stress can be tested by deciphering whether a person at the end of each month has more than enough, just enough, or not enough money or resources. However, SES is more commonly used to depict an economic difference in society as a whole.

Socioeconomic status is typically broken into three levels (high, middle, and low) to describe the three places a family or an individual may fall into. When placing a family or individual into one of these categories, any or all of the three variables (income, education, and occupation) can be assessed.

Education in higher socioeconomic families is typically stressed as much more important, both within the household as well as the local community. In poorer areas, where food, shelter and safety are a priority, education is typically regarded as less important. Youth in poorer households are particularly at risk for many health and social problems in the United States, such as unwanted pregnancies, addiction, drug abuse, diabetes and obesity.

Additionally, low income and education have been shown to be strong predictors of a range of physical and mental health problems, including meningitis, respiratory viruses, arthritis, coronary disease, psychosis, and schizophrenia. These problems may result from environmental conditions at home or in the workplaces, or using the social causation model where disability or mental illness, may be the precursor leading to a person's social status including freedoms and liberties.

== Important factors ==
=== Income ===
Income refers to wages, salaries, profits, rents, and any flow of earnings received. Income can also come in the form of unemployment or worker's compensation, social security, pensions, interests or dividends, royalties, trusts, alimony, or other governmental, public, or family financial assistance. It can also come from monetary winnings, like lotteries and other games or contests where money is awarded as a prize.

Income can be looked at in two terms: relative and absolute. John Maynard Keynes's absolute income hypothesis predicts that as income increases, so will consumption, but not at the same rate. Relative income dictates a person's or family's savings and consumption based on the family's income in relation to others. Income is a commonly used measure of SES because it is relatively easy to figure for most individuals.

Income inequality is most commonly measured around the world by the Gini coefficient, where 0 corresponds to perfect equality and 1 means perfect inequality. Low-income families focus on meeting immediate needs and do not accumulate wealth that could be passed on to future generations, thus increasing inequality. Families with higher and expendable income can accumulate wealth and focus on meeting immediate needs while being able to consume and enjoy luxuries and weather crises.

=== Education ===
Education also plays a role in determining income. Median earnings increase with each level of education. Higher levels of education are associated with better economic and psychological outcomes (i.e.: more income, more control, and greater social support and networking).

Education plays a pivotal role in skillsets and cultivating specific qualities that stratify people with higher SES from lower SES. Parents from lower SES households have been observed as being more likely to give orders to their children in their interactions while parents with a higher SES are more likely to encourage questioning in their children in the interest of fostering critical thinking. Research has shown how children who are born in lower SES households have weaker language skills compared to children raised in higher SES households. These language skills affect their abilities to learn and thus exacerbate the problem of education disparity between low and high SES neighborhoods.

Research shows that lower SES students have lower and slower academic achievement as compared with students of higher SES. This may be attributed to the abundance of resources available to the upper and upper middle class school districts and parents, while the equivalent in areas which are predominantly lower-middle/working class do not have the resources (for staffing quality teachers, updating textbooks, providing free tutoring or counseling for students who need it in order to succeed at school, etc.).

==== Female education ====
The socioeconomic impact of female education constitutes a significant area of research within international development. Increases in the amount of female education in regions tends to correlate with high levels of development. Some of the effects are related to economic development. Women's education increases the income of women and leads to growth in GDP. Other effects are related to social development. Educating girls leads to a number of social benefits, including many related to women's empowerment.

=== Occupation ===
Occupational prestige, as one component of SES, encompasses both income and educational attainment. The occupational status reflects the educational attainment required to obtain the job and income levels that vary with different jobs and within ranks of occupations. Additionally, it shows achievement in skills required for the job. Occupational status measures social position by describing job characteristics, decision-making ability and control, and psychological demands on the job.

Occupations are ranked by the Census (among other organizations) and opinion polls from the general population are surveyed. Some of the most prestigious occupations are physicians and surgeons, lawyers, chemical and biomedical engineers, university professors, and communications analysts. These jobs, considered to be grouped in the high SES classification, provide more challenging work and greater control over working conditions but require more ability. The jobs with lower rankings include food preparation workers, counter attendants, bartenders and helpers, dishwashers, janitors, maids and housekeepers, vehicle cleaners, and parking lot attendants. The jobs that are less valued also offer significantly lower wages, and often are more laborious, very hazardous, and provide less autonomy.

Occupation is the most difficult factor to measure because so many exist, and there are so many competing scales. Many scales rank occupations based on the level of skill involved, from unskilled to skilled manual labour to professional, or use a combined measure using the education level needed and income involved.

In sum, the majority of researchers agree that income, education and occupation together best represent SES, while some others feel that changes in family structure should also be considered. SES affects students' cognitive abilities and academic success. Several researchers have found that SES affects students' abilities.

== Other variables ==
=== Wealth ===
Wealth distribution in the United States by net worth (2007). The net wealth of many people in the lowest 20% is negative because of debt. By 2014 the wealth gap deepened.
1. Top 1% (34.6%)
2. Next 4% (27.3%)
3. Next 5% (11.2%)
4. Next 10% (12.0%)
5. Upper Middle 20% (10.9%)
6. Middle 20% (4.00%)
7. Bottom 40% (0.20%)

Wealth, a set of economic reserves or assets, presents a source of security providing a measure of a household's ability to meet emergencies, absorb economic shocks, or provide the means to live comfortably. Wealth reflects intergenerational transitions as well as accumulation of income and savings.

Income, age, marital status, family size, religion, occupation, and education are all predictors of wealth attainment.

The wealth gap, like income inequality, is very large in the United States. There exists a racial wealth gap due in part to income disparities and differences in achievement resulting from institutional discrimination. According to Thomas Shapiro, differences in savings (due to different rates of incomes), inheritance factors, and discrimination in the housing market lead to the racial wealth gap. Shapiro claims that savings increase with increasing income, but African Americans cannot participate in this, because they make significantly less than Americans of European descent (whites). Additionally, rates of inheritance dramatically differ between African Americans and Americans of European descent. The amount a person inherits, either during a lifetime or after death, can create different starting points between two different individuals or families. These different starting points also factor into housing, education, and employment discrimination. A third reason Shapiro offers for the racial wealth gap are the various discriminations African Americans must face, like redlining and higher interest rates in the housing market. These types of discrimination feed into the other reasons why African Americans end up having different starting points and therefore fewer assets.

== Effects ==
=== Health ===
Recently, there has been increasing interest from epidemiologists on the subject of economic inequality and its relation to the health of populations. Socioeconomic status has long been related to health, those higher in the social hierarchy typically enjoy better health than those below. Socioeconomic status is an important source of health inequity, as there is a very robust positive correlation between socioeconomic status and health. This correlation suggests that it is not only the poor who tend to be sick when everyone else is healthy, but that there is a continual gradient, from the top to the bottom of the socio-economic ladder, relating status to health. Parents with a low socioeconomic status cannot afford many of the health care resources which is the reason that their children may have a more advanced illness because of the lack of treatment. This phenomenon is often called the "SES Gradient" or according to the World Health Organisation the "Social Gradient". Lower socioeconomic status has been linked to chronic stress, heart disease, ulcers, type 2 diabetes, rheumatoid arthritis, certain types of cancer, and premature aging.

There is debate regarding the cause of the SES Gradient. Researchers see a definite link between economic status and mortality due to the greater economic resources of the wealthy, but they find little correlation due to social status differences.

Other researchers such as Richard G. Wilkinson, J. Lynch, and G.A. Kaplan have found that socioeconomic status strongly affects health even when controlling for economic resources and access to health care. Most famous for linking social status with health are the Whitehall studies—a series of studies conducted on civil servants in London. The studies found that although all civil servants in England have the same access to health care, there was a strong correlation between social status and health. The studies found that this relationship remained strong even when controlling for health-affecting habits such as exercise, smoking and drinking. Furthermore, it has been noted that no amount of medical attention will help decrease the likelihood of someone getting type 2 diabetes or rheumatoid arthritis—yet both are more common among populations with lower socioeconomic status.

=== Political participation ===
Political scientists have established a consistent relationship between SES and political participation. For example, in 2004, the American Political Science Task Force on Inequality and American Democracy has found that those with higher socioeconomic status participate at higher rates than those with lower status.

=== Crime ===
Socioeconomic status (usually measured using the three variables income or wealth, occupational level, and years of education) correlates negatively with criminality, except for self-reported illegal drug use. Higher parental socioeconomic status probably has an inverse relationship with crime. Unstable employment and high frequency of unemployment correlate positively with criminality. Low socioeconomic status is thought to be positively correlated with higher levels of stress, and therefore the mental and psychological ill-effects of stress. Indeed, higher stress levels have been positively associated with a propensity to commit crime.

== Psychological ==
=== Language development ===
==== Home environment ====
The environment of low SES children is characterized by less dialogue from parents, minimal amounts of book reading, and few instances of joint attention, the shared focus of the child and adult on the same object or event, when compared to the environment of high SES children. In contrast, infants from high SES families experience more child-directed speech. At 10 months, children of high SES hear on average 400 more words than their low SES peers.

Language ability differs sharply as a function of SES, for example, the average vocabulary size of 3-year-old children from professional families was more than twice as large as for those on welfare.

Children from lower income households had greater media access in their bedrooms but lower access to portable play equipment compared to higher income children. This eventually leads children from lower socioeconomic backgrounds to be at a disadvantage when comparing them with their counterparts in terms of access to physical activities.

==== Parental interactions ====
In addition to the amount of language input from parents, SES heavily influences the type of parenting style a family chooses to practice. These different parenting styles shape the tone and purpose of verbal interactions between parent and child. For example, parents of high SES tend toward more authoritative or permissive parenting styles. These parents pose more open-ended questions to their children to encourage the latter's speech growth. In contrast, parents of low SES tend toward more authoritarian styles of address. Their conversations with their children contain more imperatives and yes/no questions that inhibits child responses and speech development.

Parental differences in addressing children may be traced to the position of their respective groups within society. Working class individuals often hold low-power, subordinate positions in the occupational world. This standing in the social hierarchy requires a personality and interaction style that is relational and capable of adjusting to circumstances. An authoritarian style of address prepares children for these types of roles, which require a more accommodating and compliant personality. Therefore, low-SES parents see the family as more hierarchical, with the parents at the top of the power structure, which shapes verbal interaction. This power differential emulates the circumstances of the working class world, where individuals are ranked and discouraged from questioning authority.

Conversely, high-SES individuals occupy high-power positions that call for greater expressivity. High-SES parents encourage their children to question the world around them. In addition to asking their children more questions, these parents push their children to create questions of their own. In contrast with low-SES parents, these individuals often view the power disparity between parent and child as detrimental to the family. Opting instead to treat children as equals, high-SES conversations are characterized by a give and take between parent and child. These interactions help prepare these children for occupations that require greater expressivity.

=== Disparities in language acquisition ===
The linguistic environment of low and high SES children differs substantially, which affects many aspects of language and literacy development such as semantics, syntax, morphology, and phonology.

==== Semantics ====
Semantics is the study of the meaning of words and phrases. Semantics covers vocabulary, which is affected by SES. Children of high SES have larger expressive vocabularies by the age of 24 months due to more efficient processing of familiar words. By age 3, there are significant differences in the amount of dialogue and vocabulary growth between children of low and high SES. The effects of SES on vocabulary extend from childhood to adolescence and even into early adulthood according to a large socioeconomically diverse study. A lack of joint attention in children contributes to poor vocabulary growth when compared to their high SES peers. Joint attention and book reading are important factors that affect children's vocabulary growth. With joint attention, a child and adult can focus on the same object, allowing the child to map out words. For example, a child sees an animal running outside and the mom points to it and says, "Look, a dog." The child will focus its attention to where its mother is pointing and map the word dog to the pointed animal. Joint attention thus facilitates word learning for children.

==== Syntax ====
Syntax refers to the arrangement of words and phrases to form sentences. SES affects the production of sentence structures. Although 22- to 44-month-old children's production of simple sentence structures does not vary by SES, low SES does contribute to difficulty with complex sentence structures. Complex sentences include sentences that have more than one verb phrase. An example of a complex sentence is, "I want you to sit there". The emergence of simple sentence structures is seen as a structure that is obligatory in everyday speech. Complex sentence structures are optional and can only be mastered if the environment fosters its development.

This lag in the sentence formation abilities of low SES children may be caused by less frequent exposure to complex syntax through parental speech. Low SES parents ask fewer response-coaxing questions of their children which limits the opportunities of these children to practice more complex speech patterns. Instead, these parents give their children more direct orders, which has been found to negatively influence the acquisition of more difficult noun and verb phrases. In contrast, high SES households ask their children broad questions to cultivate speech development. Exposure to more questions positively contributes to children's vocabulary growth and complex noun phrase constructions.

==== Morphology ====
Children's grasp of morphology, the study of how words are formed, is affected by SES. Children of high SES have advantages in applying grammatical rules, such as the pluralization of nouns and adjectives compared to children of low SES. Pluralizing nouns consists of understanding that some nouns are regular and -s denotes more than one, but also understanding how to apply different rules to irregular nouns. Learning and understanding how to use plural rules is an important tool in conversation and writing. In order to communicate successfully that there is more than one dog running down the street, an -s must be added to dog. Research also finds that the gap in ability to pluralize nouns and adjectives does not diminish by age or schooling because low SES children's reaction times to pluralize nouns and adjectives do not decrease.

==== Phonology ====
Phonological awareness, the ability to recognize that words are made up of different sound units, is also affected by SES. Children of low SES between the second and sixth grades are found to have low phonological awareness. The gap in phonological awareness increases by grade level. This gap is even more problematic if children of low SES are already born with low levels of phonological awareness and their environment does not foster its growth. Children who have high phonological awareness from an early age are not affected by SES.

==== Positive outcomes of low SES ====
Given the large amount of research on the setbacks children of low SES face, there is a push by child developmental researchers to steer research to a more positive direction regarding low SES. The goal is to highlight the strengths and assets low income families possess in raising children. For example, African American preschoolers of low SES exhibit strengths in oral narrative, or storytelling, that may promote later success in reading. These children have better narrative comprehension when compared to peers of higher SES. Since 2012, there has also been some research on the Shift-and-persist model, which attempts to account for the counterintuitive positive health outcomes that can occur in individuals who grow up in low SES families.

=== Literacy development ===
A gap in reading growth exists between low SES and high SES children, which widens as children move on to higher grades. Reading assessments that test reading growth include measures on basic reading skills (i.e., print familiarity, letter recognition, beginning and ending sounds, rhyming sounds, word recognition), vocabulary (receptive vocabulary), and reading comprehension skills (i.e., listening comprehension, words in context). The reading growth gap is apparent between the spring of kindergarten and the spring of first-grade, the time when children rely more on the school for reading growth and less on their parents. Initially, high SES children begin as better readers than their low SES counterparts. As children get older, high SES children progress more rapidly in reading growth rates than low SES children. These early reading outcomes affect later academic success. The further children fall behind, the more difficult it is to catch up and the more likely they will continue to fall behind. By the time students enter high school in the United States, low SES children are considerably behind their high SES peers in reading growth.

==== Home environment ====
Home environment is one of the leading factors of a child's well-being. Children living in a poor home with inadequate living conditions are more likely to be susceptible to illness and injuries. The disparities in experiences in the home environment between children of high and low SES affect reading outcomes. The home environment is considered the main contributor to SES reading outcomes. Children of low SES status are read to less often and have fewer books in the home than their high SES peers, which suggests an answer to why children of low SES status have lower initial reading scores than their high SES counterparts upon entering kindergarten. Low SES parents are also less involved in their children's schooling. The fact that many students go to school outside of their home to learn does not mean that it is the only determinant of their literacy growth. Parenting at home plays a role in shaping emotional, physical and mental health, all things that are extremely important to educational success in the classroom. This is a crucial factor that must be acknowledged by educators because boundaries such as constant parenting stress and approach to learning, for example, have a major impact on the students' literacy development.

The home environment makes the largest contribution to the prediction of initial kindergarten reading disparities. Characteristics of the home environment include home literacy environment and parental involvement in school. Home literacy environment is characterized by the frequency with which parents engage in joint book reading with the child, the frequency with which children read books outside of school, and the frequency with which household members visited the library with the child. Parental involvement in school is characterized by attending a parent–teacher conference, attending a parent–teacher association (PTA) meeting, attending an open house, volunteering, participating in fundraising, and attending a school event. Resources, experiences, and relationships associated with the family are most closely associated with reading gaps when students' reading levels are first assessed in kindergarten. The influence of family factors on initial reading level may be due to children experiencing little schooling before kindergarten—they mainly have their families to rely on for their reading growth.

Socioeconomic status plays a role in the involvement of certain parents over others. It affects parenting practices and as a result proves to be a strong predictor of child achievement when comparing households. A parent's involvement in their child's reading literacy performance progress is often overcome by demographic factors such as poverty, racial and ethnic identity, family and parenting stress, and the parent's educational level. Studies show that when parents become involved in reading-related activities with their children outside of school, reading performance, literacy, love for reading and language skills are more likely to improve. Parent involvement in students' education is a large factor in their literacy achievement, but the way they parent has a large impact on the overall development of the child. These kinds of involvements are often determined by privilege and the level of stress that a parent must endure, especially when of low socioeconomic status. The reading literacy gap has been further exposed by the enhancement of these already existing inequalities. Studies have found a direct link between Family Processes (including parenting stress and discipline practices), Social-Emotional Readiness (including approaches to learning and self control), and Reading Literacy. Although seeming unrelated, the way that a parent interacts with their child and their child's learning at home sets the stage for how well they will be able to improve their reading literacy in school.

The disadvantages of the achievement gap have exposed itself further for students and children as students have been forced to practice remote learning of the 2020 pandemic. Limited access to the correct school resources affects a child's literacy level dramatically, even more so during the switch to online learning, given the combination of decreased parent involvement and access to outdoor play. Low to lower-middle class households had the highest rate of employment change during the pandemic, which includes loss of employment, reduced hours and/or reduced pay. Large historical events like this one have only extenuated and exposed already existing inequities and in turn have negatively affected students of these demographics. The US Department of Labor revealed that layoffs that occurred during the COVID-19 pandemic had the biggest impact on historically minorities groups, which include Black, Latino, low income workers, and women. This means that children of these same working adults experienced disparities as well. In a 2013 report by the US Department of Commerce, it was found that only 55% of African American and 58% of rural households had any internet access in their home. This can be compared to the 74% of white and 81% of Asian American homes that had reliable internet. Comparing this 2013 report to the occurrences existing in 2020 are not very different given that the demographic students still experience this "digital gap" and disproportionate lack in access to the internet and/or technological equipment necessary. Without access to the correct materials at home, including books and digital tools, students cannot perform as well in reading literacy as their more privileged classmates.

Family SES is also associated with reading achievement growth during the summer. Students from high SES families continue to grow in their ability to read after kindergarten and students from low SES families fall behind in their reading growth at a comparable amount. Additionally, the summer setback disproportionately affects African American and Hispanic students because they are more likely than White students to come from low SES families. Also, low SES families typically lack the appropriate resources to continue reading growth when school is not in session. After the long summer break, it is found that the reading literacy gap between middle and lower class students is about 3 months long. This is a substantial amount of skills lost over a period of break from classes that, if not addressed, can grow extremely worse over time. It is especially important to address this issue and create solutions for young students of low SES in order to address the cycle of disadvantages faced by these communities. Studies show that by providing books to disadvantaged students over the summer, the reading achievement dramatically improves for elementary school students. Specifically, providing access to self-selected books consistently over the months of summers is successful in limiting reading setbacks. Many of these students continue to feel discouraged, have less motivation and therefore fall more behind. By providing encouragement through opportunity, there is more chance of future success in literacy development.

==== Neighborhood influence ====
The neighborhood setting in which children grow up contributes to reading disparities between low and high SES children. These neighborhood qualities include but are not limited to garbage or litter in the street, individuals selling or using drugs in the street, burglary or robbery in the area, violent crime in the area, vacant homes in the area, and how safe it is to play in the neighborhood. Low SES children are more likely to grow up in such neighborhood conditions than their high SES peers. Community support for the school and poor physical conditions surrounding the school are also associated with children's reading. Neighborhood factors help explain the variation in reading scores in school entry, and especially as children move on to higher grades. As low SES children in poor neighborhood environments get older, they fall further behind their high SES peers in reading growth and thus have a more difficult time developing reading skills at grade level.

In a study by M. Keels, it was determined that when low-income families are moved from poor neighborhoods to suburban neighborhoods, there are reductions in delinquency in children. When comparing different social statuses of families, the environment of a neighborhood turns out to be a major factor in contributing to the growth of a child.

==== School influence ====
School characteristics, including characteristics of peers and teachers, contribute to reading disparities between low and high SES children. For instance, peers play a role in influencing early reading proficiency. In low SES schools, there are higher concentrations of less skilled, lower SES, and minority peers who have lower gains in reading. The number of children reading below grade and the presence of low-income peers were consistently associated with initial achievement and growth rates. Low SES peers tend to have limited skills and fewer economic resources than high SES children, which makes it difficult for children to grow in their reading ability. The most rapid growth of reading ability happens between the spring of kindergarten and the spring of first grade. Teacher experience (number of years teaching at a particular school and the number of years teaching a particular grade level), teacher preparation to teach (based on the number of courses taken on early education, elementary education, and child development), the highest degree earned, and the number of courses taken on teaching reading all determine whether or not a reading teacher is qualified. Low SES students are more likely to have less qualified teachers, which is associated with their reading growth rates being significantly lower than the growth rates of their high SES counterparts.

=== Influences on nonverbal behavior ===
Children of parents with a high SES tended to express more disengagement behaviors than their peers of low SES. This study by Michael Kraus and Dacher Keltner was published in the December 2008 issue of Psychological Science. In this context, disengagement behaviors included self-grooming, fidgeting with nearby objects, and doodling while being addressed. In contrast, engagement behaviors included head nods, eyebrow raises, laughter and gazes at one's partner. These cues indicated an interest in one's partner and the desire to deepen and enhance the relationship. Participants of low SES tended to express more engagement behaviors toward their conversational partners, while their high SES counterparts displayed more disengagement behaviors. Authors hypothesized that, as SES rises, the capacity to fulfill one's needs also increases. This may lead to greater feelings of independence, making individuals of high SES less inclined to gain rapport with conversational partners because they are less likely to need their assistance in the future.

== See also ==
- Economic mobility
- Intelligence and socio-economic status
- Identity performance
- NRS social grade
- Social class
- Social comparison theory
- Social status
- Status attainment
- Shift-and-persist model
