= Concentrated disadvantage =

Sociological term based on socioeconomic status of neighborhoods

A concentrated disadvantage is a sociological term for the cumulative, spatially clustered presence of multiple forms of socioeconomic hardship within a neighborhood or small geographic area. It captures not just poverty, but the intensity and co-occurrence of structural conditions—such as joblessness, reliance on public assistance, family instability, and demographic isolation—that become mutually reinforcing when they are geographically concentrated. It is structural and rooted in macroeconomic and demographic forces and policies. Importantly, disadvantage is concentrated in space and produces neighborhood-level effects. Its spatial clustering shapes local institutions, social networks, collective efficacy, and exposure to violence. The neighborhood, not the individual household, is the unit where disadvantage accumulates and operates.

William Julius Wilson (especially in The Truly Disadvantaged, 1987) laid the theoretical foundation by describing how economic restructuring and racial segregation produced high-poverty, highly isolated neighborhoods. Robert J. Sampson, along with collaborators such as Stephen Raudenbush and Jeffrey Morenoff, formalized the term in empirical research. In their 1997–2001 studies, they operationalized an index of concentrated disadvantage using census measures like poverty rate, unemployment, single-parent households, and public assistance.

Concentrated disadvantage is one of several structural indices used to capture the socioeconomic conditions of neighborhoods; it is often examined alongside related measures such as concentrated affluence, residential stability, and immigrant concentration. Researchers also employ broader inequality metrics—most notably the Index of Concentration at the Extremes, which reflects the spatial separation of affluence and deprivation. Together, these indices describe complementary dimensions of neighborhood structure and context, enabling a more comprehensive understanding of how place-based conditions shape social, economic, and health outcomes.

== Associations and effects ==
A substantial body of research documents links between concentrated disadvantage and a range of negative outcomes. It is essential, however, to interpret these associations with the structural nature of disadvantage in mind: these patterns arise from macro-level forces and neighborhood conditions shaped by policy, segregation, and economic change—not from the individual behaviors or characteristics of residents.

Residents of neighborhoods characterized by concentrated disadvantage experience worse physical and mental health across the life course, including higher rates of chronic disease, infant mortality, and physiological stress. These health disparities reflect both material hardship and the cumulative biological strain associated with living in persistently deprived environments.

Concentrated disadvantage has been found to be positively related to homicide rates and reduces probability of high school completion. A positive association between concentrated disadvantage and rates of violence more generally has also been found; this relationship is mediated primarily by collective efficacy. Neighborhood disadvantage is consistently linked to increased police contact, arrest, and incarceration, even after accounting for individual factors. These patterns reflect both elevated exposure to crime and heightened surveillance and control in disadvantaged communities. There is also evidence that juvenile court officials perceive more disadvantaged neighborhoods as more dangerous, and so are less likely to release youth from such neighborhoods into their communities.

Child development is enhanced the most in neighborhoods with approximately equal amounts of concentrated disadvantage and affluence. Children growing up in disadvantaged neighborhoods tend to exhibit lower academic achievement, reduced school readiness, and higher dropout rates. Longitudinal evidence shows that sustained exposure to such environments can have lasting effects on cognitive development and educational attainment.

Long-term studies show that children raised in neighborhoods with concentrated disadvantage experience reduced upward mobility and poorer adult outcomes, including lower earnings and greater criminal justice involvement. These effects accumulate across generations, reinforcing persistent spatial inequality.

== Measurement ==
Concentrated disadvantage is typically measured using composite indices derived from neighborhood-level census variables. There is no single universal formula for concentrated disadvantage and different studies use slightly different sets of census variables.

Sampson and colleagues developed an index where concentrated disadvantage is calculated based on five metrics. These metrics are:

1. Percent of individuals below the poverty line
2. Percent of individuals on public assistance
3. Percent female-headed households,
4. Percent unemployed, and
5. Percent less than age 18.

Other researchers use a related but expanded set of indicators—such as welfare receipt, poverty, unemployment, female-headed households, racial composition, and the density of children—to capture the structural features of neighborhood disadvantage. Not all scholars include racial composition because it can confound race with structural disadvantage.

== See also ==
- Concentrated poverty
