= Bruce McEwen =

American neuroscientist (1938–2020)

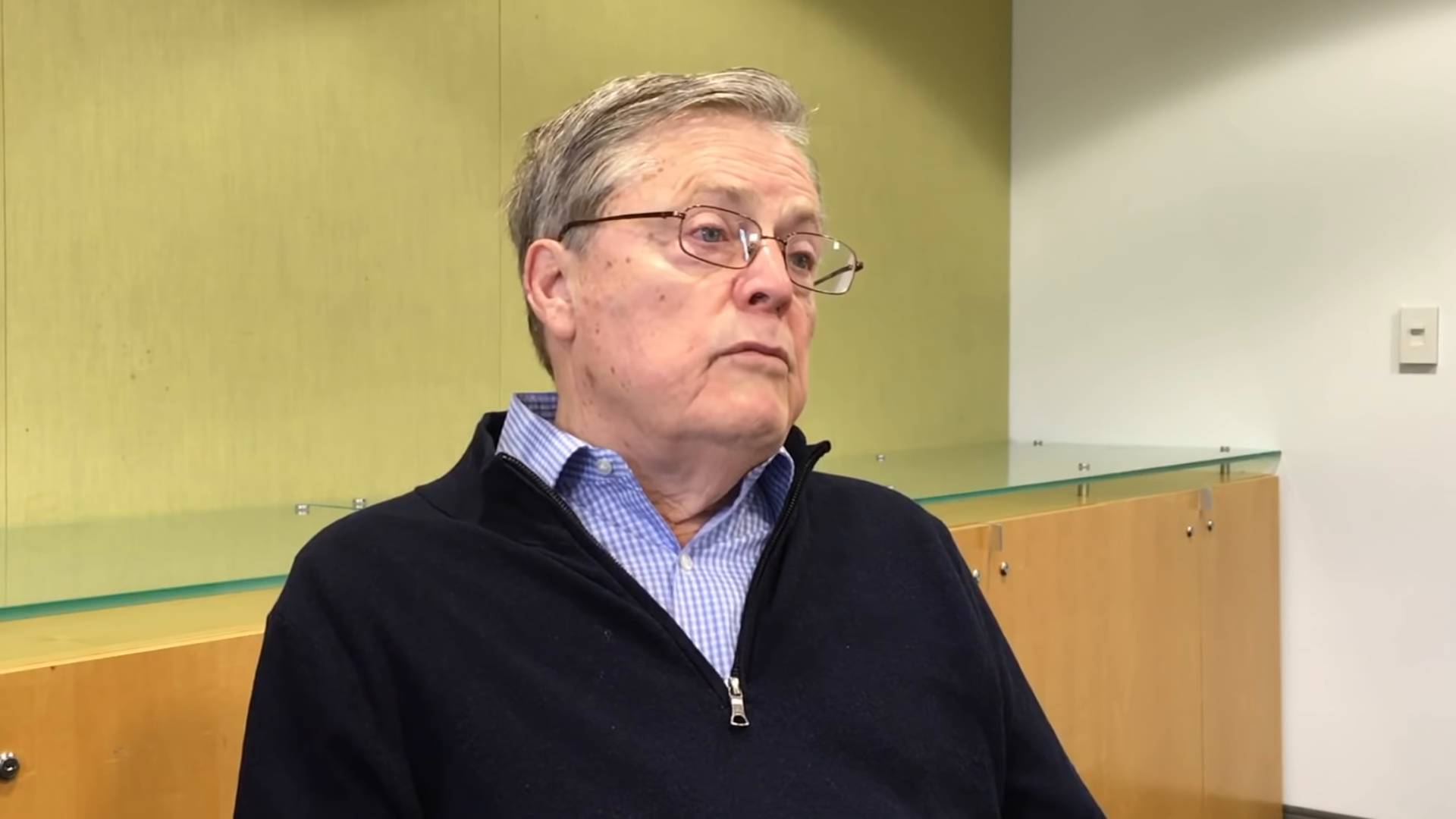
- Bruce McEwen in an NCCIH interview entitled "Stress and Your Body"
- Born: Bruce Sherman McEwen; January 17, 1938; Fort Collins, Colorado, U.S.
- Died: January 2, 2020 (aged 81)
- Education: Oberlin College (BS); Rockefeller University (PhD)
- Known for: Allostatic load
- Awards: Dale Medal of the Society for Endocrinology, Karl Spencer Lashley Award (2005), Pasarow Award in Neuropsychiatry (2005), Goldman-Rakic Prize for Cognitive Neuroscience (2005), Gold Medal Award from the Society for Biological Psychiatry (2009), IPSEN Foundations Prize in Neuroplasticity (2010), IPSEN Foundations Prize in Endocrine Regulations (2017)
- Scientific career
- Fields: neuroscience, biological psychiatry, endocrinology
- Institutions: Rockefeller University, University of Minnesota
- Thesis: Energy Metabolism in Cell Nuclei (1964)
- Doctoral advisor: Alfred Mirsky
- Doctoral students: Heather Cameron; Robert Sapolsky

Bruce Sherman McEwen (January 17, 1938 – January 2, 2020) was an American neuroendocrinologist and head of the Harold and Margaret Milliken Hatch Laboratory of Neuroendocrinology at Rockefeller University. He was known for his work on the effects of environmental and psychological stress, having coined the term allostatic load.

== Career ==
McEwen received his bachelor's degree in chemistry from Oberlin College and his Ph.D. in cell biology from Rockefeller University in 1964. The McEwen laboratory was at the forefront of estrogen and glucocorticoid action in the brain for decades. McEwen's group demonstrated for the first time that estrogen can increase dendritic spine density in the CA1 subfield of the hippocampus. In addition, his lab also discovered stress-induced dendritic retraction in the CA3 hippocampal subfield. By pioneering the role of both gonadal and adrenal steroid action in the brain, the McEwen laboratory helped develop the modern concept of stress. His research has focused on glucocorticoids, stress and neuronal degeneration.

McEwen's notable doctoral students include Robert Sapolsky, Catherine Woolley, and Heather Cameron, and postdoctoral fellows include Edo Ronald de Kloet, Michael Meaney, and Elizabeth Gould.

McEwen was a former president of the Society for Neuroscience and was a member of the National Academy of Sciences, the American Academy of Arts and Sciences and the National Academy of Medicine.

McEwen published his first paper in 1959, and eventually published more than 700 peer-reviewed articles in journals including Nature, JAMA: The Journal of the American Medical Association, The New England Journal of Medicine, Neurobiology of Aging and The Journal of Neuroscience. His expertise and work have been featured on ABC, NBC, CNN, PBS, NPR, BBC, and in The New York Times, The Wall Street Journal, and many others. He was co-author of the book The End of Stress As We Know It, with science writer Elizabeth Norton Lasley, and another book The Hostage Brain, with science writer Harold M. Schmeck Jr. He has received numerous awards including a share of the IPSEN Foundation Prize in Neuroplasticity, the Gold Medal award from the Society for Biological Psychiatry, the Pasarow Award in Neuropsychiatry, the British Endocrine Society's Dale Medal, the Goldman-Rakic Prize for Cognitive Neuroscience from the Brain & Behavior Research Foundation and the Karl Spencer Lashley Award from the American Philosophical Society.

McEwen was on the Scientific Advisory Board of Anti-AgingGames.com where he collaborated with Nolan Bushnell, the founder of Atari, and with a team of world-renowned behavioral neuroscientists to create memory, focus and relaxation games for healthy adults over the age of 35.

== See also ==
- Eliot Stellar
