= David de Wied =

Dutch professor of pharmacology (1925–2004)

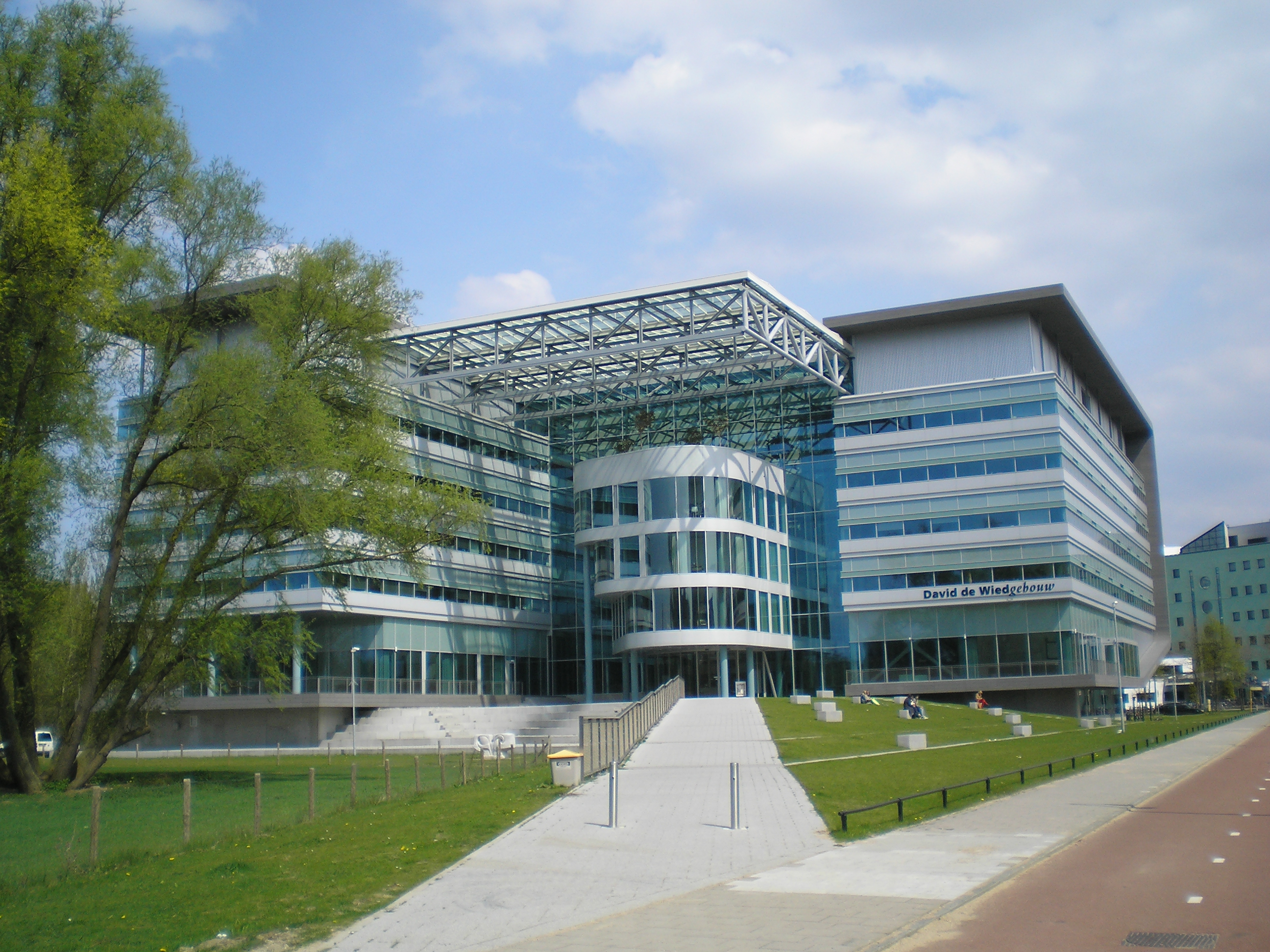
University of Utrecht building named after de Wied

David de Wied (12 January 1925 – 21 February 2004, aged 79) was a Dutch professor of pharmacology at the University of Utrecht.

Due to the necessity of hiding as a Jew during the Second World War, De Wied only started in 1947 studying medicine at the University of Groningen. In 1952 he received his PhD with his thesis "Vitamin C, Adrenal gland and Adaptation" and in 1955 he graduated as physician. In 1961 he was appointed professor of experimental endocrinology and from 1963 he served as director of the Rudolf Magnus Institute and professor of pharmacology in Utrecht.

De Wied gained international esteem chiefly by his discovery of neuropeptides and their value to memory and learning. The subject was made comprehensible to the public when the media coined the term "learning-pill" describing the effect of the discovery.

De Wied's notable doctoral students include Willem-Hendrik Gispen, Edo Ronald de Kloet, Jan Van Ree and Marian Joëls.

De Wied was a member of many learned societies including the Royal Netherlands Academy of Arts and Sciences (KNAW). He was chairman of the KNAW department of physics from 1981 until 1984 and general president between 1984 and 1990.

In 1996 De Wied received the Dr. A.H. Heineken Prize for medicine. He was Commander of the Order of Orange-Nassau and Knight of the Order of the Netherlands Lion.

In 2011 the new faculty building of exact science of the University of Utrecht was named after David de Wied.

David de Wied received an honorary degree from Binghamton University.
