= Shift-and-persist model =

The shift-and-persist model has emerged in order to account for unintuitive, positive health outcomes in some individuals of low socioeconomic status. A large body of research has previously linked low socioeconomic status to poor physical and mental health outcomes, including early mortality. Low socioeconomic status is hypothesized to get "under the skin" by producing chronic activation of the sympathetic nervous system and hypothalamic–pituitary–adrenal axis, which increases allostatic load, leading to the pathogenesis of chronic disease. However, some individuals of low socioeconomic status do not appear to experience the expected, negative health effects associated with growing up in poverty. To account for this, the shift-and-persist model proposes that, as children, some individuals of low socioeconomic status learn adaptive strategies for regulating their emotions ("shifting") and focusing on their goals ("persisting") in the face of chronic adversity. According to this model, the use of shift-and-persist strategies diminishes the typical negative effects of adversity on health by leading to more adaptive biological, cognitive, and behavioral responses to daily stressors.

== Shift strategies ==
Broadly, "shift" strategies encompass a variety of cognitive and emotion self-regulation approaches that individuals use to deal with stress, including cognitive restructuring, reframing, reappraisal, and acceptance strategies, which change the meaning of a stressor or reduce its emotional impact. These shift strategies particularly focus on changing one's response to a stressor, instead of attempting to change the situation or stressor itself. As shift strategies depend more on internal processes (self-control and regulation), than external resources, it is hypothesized that shift strategies may be particularly adaptive responses to the chronic, uncontrollable stressors that are associated with low socioeconomic status.

== Persist strategies ==
According to Chen and Miller, "persist" strategies are any strategies that help individuals to maintain optimism about the future, create meaning from their experiences of challenge and hardship, and persist "with strength in the face of adversity."

== Measurement ==
To evaluate the combination of shift-and-persist strategy use, distinct "shift" and "persist" constructs were initially measured separately by using multiple, self-report measures of reappraisal, emotional reactivity, and future orientation in early research on this model.

In 2015, Chen and colleagues published the Shift-and-Persist Scale, which is a combined self-report measure that assesses both shift and persist strategies. The Shift-and-Persist Scale has been validated for use with adults and teenagers. The questionnaire asks respondents to rate how well 14 statements about various approaches to dealing with life stressors apply to them on a 1-4 scale. Out of the 14 items on the measure, 4 assess a respondent's use of shift strategies, 4 load onto persist strategies, and 6 items are non-relevant distractors that are ignored during scoring. When scoring the Shift-and-Persist Scale, one item (#4) is reverse-scored. This scale is publicly available online.

A simplified 5-item Shift-and-Persist scale has also been published for use with younger children and adolescents (ages 9–15). Total scores on this version of the Shift-and-Persist Scale range from 0-20, such that higher scores are indicative of greater use of shift-and-persist strategies. This scale is also publicly available online and has been previously used in research with children from kindergarten through 8th grade.

== Proposed mechanisms ==
=== Reduction of the harmful biological effects of stress ===
The shift-and-persist model mainly hypothesizes that these strategies have protective effects for the health of low socioeconomic status individuals because they affect biological and physiological stress response tendencies that are relevant for disease. There is some evidence that shift responses (e.g., reappraisal) to acute stressors are associated with attenuated physiological responses to stress, including reduced cardiovascular reactivity. Specifically, reappraisal has been linked to a "healthier" pattern of hypothalamic–pituitary–adrenal axis response characterized by a rapid return to homeostasis (i.e., faster cortisol recovery) in the wake of a stressor. Persist tendencies, such as optimism, have also been associated with adaptive immune responses and faster cortisol recovery. By constraining the magnitude and duration of biological stress responses, including cardiovascular, hypothalamic–pituitary–adrenal axis, and inflammatory responses to stress, shift-and-persist responses are hypothesized to prevent the wear and tear on these systems that increases allostatic load and risk for chronic diseases of aging.

Cross-sectional studies provide some evidence that greater emotion regulation abilities are associated with reduced health risk on a variety of indicators of allostatic load. Similarly, self-reported trait levels of optimism and purpose in life have been linked to better concurrent health and health trajectories over time. However, most of the health benefits associated with shift-and-persist consistent strategies are only seen in low socioeconomic status samples.

=== Enhancement of adaptive biological stress-recovery systems ===
Another alternative, but not mutually exclusive hypothesis, is that shift-and-persist strategies affect health by increasing or up-regulating biological responses that enhance stress recovery and resilience. In particular, the parasympathetic nervous system's functioning may be enhanced by shift-and-persist response tendencies. Emotion regulation abilities that are consistent with shift-coping have been linked to greater parasympathetic nervous system functioning at rest, as indexed by higher levels of high-frequency heart rate variability. Further, the parasympathetic nervous system is highly integrated with, and may contribute to the down-regulation of hypothalamic–pituitary–adrenal axis and immune system stress responses that influence allostatic load over time. Although parasympathetic nervous system activity is correlated with aspects of shift-and-persist coping, it is not yet established that the use of these strategies actually increases parasympathetic nervous system activity.

The oxytocin system has also been identified as another potential mechanism by which shift-and-persist strategies could influence health outcomes. Oxytocin is a hormone that has been linked to a wide range of positive social and emotional functions and can be used to effectively attenuate hypothalamic–pituitary–adrenal axis and sympathetic nervous system responses to stress. However, there is little research examining the interplay between shift-and-persist strategy use and the oxytocin system.

=== Impact on health behaviors ===
It has also been proposed that shift-and-persist strategies may buffer health outcomes in individuals of low socioeconomic status by affecting health behaviors. Previous research has demonstrated that, regardless of socioeconomic status, individuals with emotion regulation difficulties are also likely to engage in poorer health behaviors, including over-eating, sedentary lifestyle, risky sexual health behaviors, and drug use. Individuals of low socioeconomic status who learn to regulate their emotions more effectively, by using "shift" strategies in childhood, may be more likely than their peers with emotion regulation difficulties to establish and sustain positive health behaviors throughout development. Similarly, persist strategies that help individuals to maintain a positive focus on the future may also affect wellbeing through health behaviors. Prior studies have linked being "future-oriented" to lower levels of drug use and sexual risk behaviors. Therefore, it is possible that individuals who regularly use shift-and-persist strategies will be more likely to practice positive health behaviors, which promote healthy development and aging.

However, the relationships between emotion regulation abilities and health behavior are bidirectional. Health behaviors, such as physical activity and sleep hygiene, can also have powerful effects on our capacity to successfully regulate emotions.

== Research support for associations with health ==
Since 2012, integrative research groups concerned with clinical health psychology, social psychology, psychoneuroimmunology, and public health have begun to evaluate the relationships postulated by the shift-and-persist model. The majority of empirical studies on this topic test whether shift-and-persist strategies are associated with differential health outcomes in low vs. high socioeconomic status samples.

Thus far, high levels of shift-and-persist strategy use have been linked to:

- Lower total allostatic load in adults who grew up in low, but not high, socioeconomic status households.
- Lower body mass index in children from low, but not high, socioeconomic status families.
- Reduced low-grade inflammation in adolescents (and parents) from low socioeconomic status families.
- A "healthier" profile of hypothalamic–pituitary–adrenal axis functioning, as indexed by diurnal cortisol in children from low socioeconomic status families.
- Lower levels of asthma-related impairment and inflammation in children from low, but not high, socioeconomic status families.
- Better asthma profiles in children and teens from families reporting low, but not high, perceived social status.
- Lower levels of depressive symptoms in Latinx youth from low, but not high, income families.

Although it has been proposed that a variety of psychological interventions for at-risk youth of low socioeconomic status may reduce health disparities, in part, by increasing shift-and-persist tendencies in families, the majority of studies on shift-and-persist have been cross-sectional. Therefore, it remains unknown if shift-and-persist strategies play a causal role in reducing the negative impact of low socioeconomic status on health. More longitudinal and treatment studies are needed to evaluate directional and causal hypotheses based upon the shift-and-persist model.

== See also ==
- Social Determinants of Health
- Socioeconomic Status and Mental Health
- Stress
- Emotional Regulation
- Allostatic Load
- Psychoneuroimmunology
