= Gene Brody =

American psychologist

- Born: May 15, 1950 (age 75); Los Angeles, California
- Citizenship: American
- Education: University of California, Santa Barbara (B.A., 1972); University of Arizona (M.A., 1973; Ph.D., 1976)
- Known for: Educational and social adjustment in children Biological and physiological effects of psychological stress
- Awards: Reuben Hill Award from the National Council on Family Relations (2005, 2007); Advances in Culture and Diversity in Prevention Science Award, Society for Prevention Research, 2017; Presidents’ Award of Distinction for Team Science, Georgia Clinical and Translational Science Alliance, 2019; James McKeen Cattell Fellow Award for lifetime achievement from the Association for Psychological Science (2023)
- Scientific career
- Fields: Developmental psychology
- Institutions: University of Georgia; Emory University
- Thesis: Factors influencing selective incorporation of modeled behavior into moral judgments in young children (1976)

Gene Howard Brody is an American developmental psychologist and prevention scientist and Regent's Professor at the University of Georgia and is the founder and co-director of the University of Georgia's Center for Family Research. He is known for his research on the physiological, biological, and mental health effects of poverty, community disadvantage, and racial discrimination and for the development of efficacious prevention programs for African American youth and their families.

== Early life and education ==
Brody grew up in California and earned a Bachelor of Arts in Psychology at the University of California, Santa Barbara in 1972. He then earned a Master of Arts in Developmental Psychology at the University of Arizona in 1973 followed by a PhD in Developmental Psychology in 1976 also at the University of Arizona.

== Research and career ==
He began his academic career as an assistant professor at the University of Georgia in 1976 and began a program of research in which he became known for examining the physiological, biological, and mental health effects of poverty, community disadvantage, and racial discrimination. His longitudinal studies that focus on strengths rather than deficits in investigating resilience among Black Americans have not only demonstrated how such work can help narrow disparities but has influenced theoretical and methodological approaches in developmental and prevention science. His research has shown, for example, that African American youth who are exposed to family economic hardship and racial discrimination in childhood and adolescence are more likely to develop diabetes, increased allostatic load, accelerated cellular aging, and higher levels of systemic inflammation later in life. He has also investigated how these effects can be offset by other environmental variables, such as support from family members.

Brody's recent research has shed light on the ways in which there may be physiological costs associated with achieving resilience on outward indicators of psychosocial functioning, a phenomenon known as “skin-deep resilience”. Although high levels of self-control, goal directed behavior, and high-effort coping are thought to contribute to outward signs of resilience in adverse environments, these same behaviors may undermine individuals’ physical health as a result of the physical strain and wear-and-tear associated with growing up with socioeconomic disadvantage.

Much of this research has led to deeper work understanding prevention strategies and direct intervention programs which focus on strengthening family relationships, parenting processes and youth competencies as well as preventing negative outcomes. The Strong African American Families and Strong African American Families-Teen programs for preadolescents and adolescents have been embedded in communities across the United States.

The Association for Psychological Science awarded him a lifetime achievement award in 2023.
