= Marian Joëls =

Dutch neuroscientist and academic

- Born: November 29, 1956 (age 69); Amsterdam, Netherlands
- Education: University of Amsterdam (MSc); Utrecht University (PhD)
- Known for: Effects of stress hormones on the brain
- Awards: Knight of the Order of the Netherlands Lion (2022); Julius Axelrod Prize (2024)
- Scientific career
- Fields: Neuroscience, stress biology
- Workplaces: University of Amsterdam; Utrecht University; University of Groningen
- Doctoral advisor: David de Wied

Marian Joëls (born 29 November 1956) is a Dutch neuroscientist and academic administrator known for her research on how stress hormones affect the brain. The Society for Neuroscience credited her with "seminal contributions to the knowledge of the effects of stress on the brain, from the molecular level to the level of patient populations" when awarding her the 2024 Julius Axelrod Prize. She is an emeritus professor of neurobiology of environmental factors at the University of Groningen, where she was dean of the Faculty of Medical Sciences and a board member of the University Medical Center Groningen (UMCG) from 2016 to 2022.

== Education and early career ==
Joëls studied biology at the University of Amsterdam, graduating in 1980. She obtained her PhD in 1984 at the Rudolf Magnus Institute of Utrecht University, under the supervision of David de Wied and Ivan Urban with a thesis on the role of vasopressin in the neurophysiology of the rat lateral septum. She then carried out postdoctoral research at the University of Texas Medical Branch in Galveston and at the Scripps Research Institute in La Jolla. In Galveston she worked with Joel Gallagher and Patricia Shinnick-Gallagher, and at Scripps with George R. Siggins and Donna Gruol.

== Career ==
In 1991 Joëls was appointed associate professor at the University of Amsterdam, where she became professor of zoology in 1997. In 2003 she set up a new degree programme in psychobiology there. In 2009 she moved to Utrecht University as professor of neuroscience and director of the Rudolf Magnus Institute (later Brain Center Rudolf Magnus), which brought together basic neuroscience, neurology and psychiatry. She also served on the boards of the Netherlands Organisation for Scientific Research (NWO) and the Royal Netherlands Academy of Arts and Sciences (KNAW).

On 1 September 2016 she became dean of the Faculty of Medical Sciences at the University of Groningen and a member of the Board of Directors of the UMCG. She was the first woman to serve as dean of the faculty. She stepped down as she approached retirement age and was succeeded by Wiro Niessen on 1 February 2023.

From 2012 to 2014 she was president of the Federation of European Neuroscience Societies (FENS). The Society for Neuroscience described her as "a tireless mentor and role model" and a "lifelong champion of the equal participation of women in science", citing her work at FENS and as dean to improve the gender balance of conference speakers, to set up networks for junior and mid-career scientists, and to develop differentiated academic career paths.

== Research ==
Joëls studies how stress hormones (corticosteroids) act on the brain, using methods ranging from cellular electrophysiology in rodents to studies in human volunteers and patients.

- MR and GR effects on neurons. Working with Edo Ronald de Kloet, she showed that the two corticosteroid receptors, the mineralocorticoid receptor (MR) and the glucocorticoid receptor (GR), have complementary effects on ion conductances and neurotransmitter responses in the hippocampus. MR activation increases excitability, which is later suppressed by stress-induced GR activation, giving a U-shaped dose–response relationship.
- Rapid, non-genomic actions. In 2005 Joëls and Henk Karst found that the MR can also mediate rapid, non-genomic effects of corticosterone in the hippocampus. The SfN called her "a pioneer in the discovery of non-genomic signaling by corticosteroids". She has proposed that corticosteroid effects unfold in distinct time domains: rapid non-genomic actions followed by slower genomic changes.
- Stress, plasticity and memory. With Harm Krugers she proposed that synaptic potentiation is enhanced shortly after acute stress, after which further potentiation is suppressed, helping to preserve stress-related information. The SfN highlighted her work on how corticosteroids affect metaplasticity, memory and fear, and on the differences between acute and chronic stress in the development of psychopathology.
- Early-life stress and resilience. Her group has studied the lifelong consequences of early-life adversity and whether they can be normalised by later interventions. With de Kloet she has written on how cortisol acting through MR and GR may shift individuals between resilience and vulnerability to stress-related disorders.

== Honours and awards ==
- Member, Royal Netherlands Academy of Arts and Sciences (2002)
- Member, Hollandsche Maatschappij der Wetenschappen (2016)
- Emil Kraepelin Professorship in psychiatry, Munich (2007)
- European Medal, Society for Endocrinology (2017)
- Bruce McEwen Lifetime Achievement Award, International Society of Psychoneuroendocrinology (2019)
- ALBA–FKNE Diversity Prize (2021)
- Knight of the Order of the Netherlands Lion (2022)
- Thomassen à Thuessink medal, UMCG (2022)
- Member, Academia Europaea (2023)
- Pioneer Award (shared with Edo Ronald de Kloet), Global Stress & Resilience Network (2024)
- Julius Axelrod Prize, Society for Neuroscience (2024, shared with Robert Edwards)

== Books ==
Joëls has written books in Dutch for a general audience, on the brain and on women who were the first to reach the top of their professions.

- Een zeepaardje in je hoofd (2009)
- Meisjes zijn niet bèta-dom (2010)
- Baanbreeksters (2021). Amsterdam: Prometheus. ISBN 978-90-446-4565-1

== See also ==
- Stress (biology)
- Glucocorticoid receptor
- Mineralocorticoid receptor
