= Catherine S. Woolley =

American biologist

- Born: July 30, 1965 (age 61); Nelsonville, Ohio
- Education: Rockefeller University, Texas A&M University
- Known for: Neurobiology and neurology
- Scientific career
- Workplaces: Northwestern University, University of Washington
- Doctoral advisor: Bruce McEwen

Catherine S. Woolley (born July 30, 1965) is an American neuroendocrinologist. Woolley holds the William Deering Chair in Biological Sciences in the Department of Neurobiology, Weinberg College of Arts & Sciences, at Northwestern University. She is also a member of the Women's Health Research Institute in the Feinberg School of Medicine at Northwestern University.

Woolley studies cellular and molecular neuroscience in relation to the brain and behavior, particularly neuroendocrinology and the plasticity of neural circuits. She attempts to understand molecular mechanisms of estrogen and its interactions with the structure and function of synapses in the adult brain, and their behavioral consequences. She has been described as "a leading authority in a very exciting area of adult neuroplasticity". Her earliest work included a pioneering study demonstrating that estrogen caused structural changes to cells in the rat hippocampus. She has also shown that neuronal mechanisms in the rat brain differ in males and females. Her work has broad significance for drug development and women's health, and for the studies of epilepsy, anxiety and depression.

== Early life ==
Catherine S. Woolley was born on July 30, 1965, in Nelsonville, Ohio. She graduated from Texas A&M University in College Station, Texas, with a B.Sc. honors in zoology and was given a prize by the university for the best undergraduate honors thesis.

== Career ==
Woolley studied with Bruce McEwen at Rockefeller University, receiving her Ph.D. from Rockefeller in 1993. She did postdoctoral work at the University of Washington with Philip Schwartzkroin in the Department of Neurological Surgery.

In 1998, she became an assistant professor at Northwestern University in Evanston. In 2013, Woolley was appointed to the William Deering Chair in Biological Sciences in the Department of Neurobiology, Weinberg College of Arts & Sciences, Northwestern University. She is the founding Director of Northwestern University's undergraduate Neuroscience program, and was named a Charles Deering McCormick Professor of Teaching Excellence by Northwestern in 2018 for "transforming the landscape of undergraduate education in Weinberg."

She was elected to the Council of the Society for Neuroscience (2014–2018). She is a senior editor of The Journal of Neuroscience.

== Research ==
=== Rockefeller University ===
Bruce McEwen at Rockefeller University studies stress and its impact on the brain. With McEwen, Woolley initially studied neuroleptics and their effects on proenkephalin mRNA levels. Woolley went on to work with McEwen and Elizabeth Gould on a 1990 study that examined the brain using Golgi's method, a technique first described by Camillo Golgi in 1873. The study showed that estradiol increased the number and density of excitatory synapses of CA1 pyramidal cells in the rat hippocampus, as well as the density of dendritic spines. Both estradiol and spine density fluctuated dramatically during the estrous cycle. Woolley recognized that this suggested that the adult brain was subject to change, at least in rats; this was surprising because it was accepted at that time that the adult brain was structurally stable. Woolley's 1990 work is considered a pioneering study in hormones and synaptic plasticity. Further work established that the manipulation of female sex hormones affects hippocampal structure in adult rats.

=== University of Washington ===
Between 1993 and 1998, Woolley worked as a postdoc at the University of Washington in Seattle, with Philip Schwartzkroin. There she applied electrophysiology techniques and ultrastructural analysis to the study of hormonal effects in the brain. She studied the effects of estrogen on the release of GABA in the hippocampus. In 2000, she received the Cortical Explorer Award in recognition of her work on neuroanatomy and brain activity.

"Catherine is finding the same neuronotrophic activation by steroids whether she uses Golgi staining to count spines or the electron microscope to visualize synapses. The methods are more sophisticated and powerful, but the basic observation is the same." Cortical Explorer Award, 2000

=== Northwestern University ===
At Northwestern University, Woolley's research concentrates on how steroids effect and regulate synaptic structure and their functions. Woolley uses a spectrum of different methods in their studies such as in vitro and vivo electrophysiology, and behavioral assays to observe how the subjects reacts. As a professor at Northwestern University, Woolley has done ongoing research into the sex-specific effects of estrogens, GABAA receptors, metabotropic glutamate receptors, and endogenous cannabinoids and their roles as neuromodulators of brain development and function. In 2012, Woolley published research showing that estrogens had differential effects in the brains of female and male rats, decreasing inhibitory synaptic transmission in female rats but not in males. In 2015, her group reported that male and female rats differ in the molecular pathways affected by endocannabinoids. In female rats the drug URB-597 increased the inhibitory effect of the endocannabinoid anandamide, lessening the release of neurotransmitters. In male rats, the drug had no effect. The interaction did not reflect circulating reproductive hormones. Further research is needed to determine the extent to which rat neurology provides an accurate model for human neurology.

While the significance of these results for humans are not yet demonstrated, rats are often used as a model for studying humans. An important implication of Woolley's research is that drug testing on males should not be assumed to yield results applicable to both males and females. To understand drug action, effects on both sexes should be studied.

== Awards and honors ==
- 1998: Alfred P. Sloan Foundation Fellowship
- 2000: Cortical Explorer Award, Krieg Awards, Cajal Club
- 2002–2007: W. M. Keck Foundation Distinguished Young Scholar in Medical Research Award
- 2007: C.J. Herrick Award, American Association of Anatomists
- 2007–2009: Pioneer Award, Women's Health Research Institute, Northwestern University
- 2013: William Deering Chair in Biological Sciences, Northwestern University
- 2016: Transformative Research Award, National Institutes of Health
- 2018: Charles Deering McCormick Professor of Teaching Excellence, Northwestern University
- 2019: Gill Center Transformative Research Award, Indiana University
- 2019: Elected Member of the National Academy of Medicine
- 2021: Elected Member of the American Academy of Arts and Sciences
