= Collective efficacy =

In the sociology of crime, the term collective efficacy refers to the ability of members of a community to control the behavior of individuals and groups in the community. Control of people's behavior allows community residents to create a safe and orderly environment. Collective efficacy involves residents monitoring children playing in public areas, acting to prevent truancy and street corner "hanging" by teenagers, and confronting individuals who exploit or disturb public spaces.

Advocates of collective efficacy claim that these measures increase community control over individuals, thus creating an environment where violent crime is less likely to occur. Researchers have argued that increasing collective efficacy can lead to a significant reduction of crime in communities. Communities with high levels of collective efficacy have been found to have lower rates of violence and homicide, suggesting that community participation in preventing violence reduces crime.

Collective efficacy depends on the values shared by community members. If members of a community trust each other and are willing to cooperate to prevent violence and crime, it is more likely that they will be able to create a safe community environment.

The concept of collective efficacy has been used to explain why urban neighborhoods differ in the amount of crime that takes place in them. In urban areas where neighbors monitor group behavior and are willing to intervene to break out fights or otherwise prevent disorder, violent crime is less likely to occur.

== Description ==
Collective efficacy includes behaviors, norms and actions that residents of a given community use to achieve public order (sociologists refer to these as “informal mechanisms”). In communities where these informal practices are enforced on a day-to-day basis by community members, individuals are less likely to engage in delinquent behavior. A key element of the collective efficacy perspective is that it focuses on the effects of informal norms and practices of the community in preventing crime, rather than on the effects of formal, established institutions (such as police forces).

In order for collective efficacy to develop in a specific community or neighborhood, it is necessary that members of the community have strong feelings of trust and solidarity for each other. In communities without clear rules for cooperation between neighbors, or where neighbors distrust or fear each other, residents are less likely to work together to supervise the behavior of individuals in the community. Conversely, it is in those communities where people trust each other more and are more willing to cooperate that community supervision is more likely to deter crime. Collective efficacy thus requires that community members feel strongly bonded to each other.

Collective efficacy is thought to reduce the likelihood of crime by preventing public disputes from erupting into violence. In communities where residents are less active in enforcing order, groups of peers and associates who gather in public places are more likely to use violent means to solve disputes. The emergence of violence in turn increases the probability of these groups turning into criminal gangs, drug trafficking rings, and prostitution rackets, among other types of delinquent associations.

Collective efficacy not only reduces crime in public places, but also lowers the likelihood of some forms of crime in private spaces (for example, inside the home). A 2002 Chicago study, for example, found that collective efficacy reduces the probability of both female homicide and physical violence against females by male partners. According to the author of the study, these results can be explained by the finding that communities with high levels of trust, cooperation, and supervision are more likely to offer women several types of assistance, including support, advice, shelter, and social pressure on batterers to desist. The 2002 study, however, also found that the association between collective efficacy and lower levels of crime against women is stronger in communities where violence between intimate partners is commonly seen as negative. In other words, collective efficacy reduces crime in public and private spaces, but its effectiveness for deterring specific types of crime is higher in communities where those types of crime are disapproved of.

== Factors influencing collective efficacy ==
Collective efficacy develops more easily in some types of communities than in others. Those communities that experience high levels of population decline, as well as those where most of the residents belong to social groups that possess a smaller share of the resources available in society, are less likely to develop a sufficient level of collective efficacy to significantly prevent or reduce crime.

Economic downturns affect some areas more than others, leading individuals in affected areas to move to neighborhoods that offer better economic opportunities. Since developing mutual trust and cooperation with neighbors requires time, those communities where individuals are more likely to move out have lower levels of collective efficacy. In communities more seriously affected by residential instability, social bonds between residents are weaker, meaning that they will be less likely to cooperate in monitoring the behavior of others.

Lower income individuals, such as members of racial/ethnic minorities or female household heads, tend to live close to each other. These individuals usually lack the resources to live in areas with large proportions of affluent individuals. Residents of lower income communities are thus more likely to be excluded from contact with more advantaged people. This isolation creates feelings of helplessness and lack of control among residents of lower income neighborhoods. These feelings in turn make it less likely for trust and cooperation to develop between residents of disadvantaged communities. Lack of trust and cohesion between individuals reduces the probability that they will be willing to monitor the behavior of others or intervene to prevent crime.

== Competing theories ==
Collective efficacy is an alternative to broken windows theory, which argues that efforts to prevent small crimes such as vandalism and public drinking reduce the likelihood of crime. According to broken windows theory, when residents and authorities do not work to prevent small crimes, a sense of disorder develops in the community. This sense of disorder creates fear in the minds of residents, who become convinced that the neighborhood is unsafe. As a consequence, individuals withdraw from the community, weakening the social controls that previously kept criminals in check. This process reproduces itself, so that disorder causes crime, and crime in turn creates more fear and disorder.

Proponents of collective efficacy argue that disorder is not the most important factor that explains differences in crime. Evidence shows that disorder depends on the proportion of economically and socially disadvantaged people living in the community, as well as the level of trust and solidarity between neighbors. The influence of disorder on crime is seriously attenuated when collective efficacy is taken into account, suggesting that the latter is more relevant for explaining differences in crime between neighborhoods.

This argument does not imply that disorder is irrelevant for explaining differences in crime. A sense of disorder can increase crime by weakening social ties among community residents. For example, fear resulting from disorder can drive residents away from the community, preventing trust and solidarity from developing among neighbors. In these conditions, collective efficacy will be less likely to develop, and crime may increase as a result.

== Example ==
A study of Chicago adolescents tested whether collective efficacy explains differences in violent crime across neighborhoods, or whether these differences can instead be explained by the amount of time teenagers spend away from structured activities (such as school or work). The study found that having more unstructured time makes teenagers more likely to engage in crime, while living in a neighborhood with high collective efficacy reduces the probability of adolescents committing a crime. The association between unstructured time and crime is weaker in neighborhoods with high collective efficacy. These results suggest that the monitoring of public spaces and the willingness of neighbors to intervene to prevent violence reduce crime, even when we take into account how teenagers use their time. Moreover, collective efficacy reduces the probability that time spent away from activities such as school or work will lead to crime among teenagers.

== Collective efficacy and social ties ==
Collective efficacy focuses on how trust and solidarity among residents of the same community reduce crime. This suggests that strong relationships between neighbors make it less likely that a crime will be committed. However, high rates of crime are observed in some communities where residents have strong feelings of trust and solidarity for each other, leading some researchers to question the argument that mutual trust and solidarity reduce crime. These researchers have suggested that the reason why some communities with high trust and solidarity have high crime while others have low crime is that relationships of trust and solidarity have different effects depending on the cultural context of the community.

In communities with certain cultural characteristics, cooperation and trust between individuals can foster collective efficacy. In other communities, cooperation and trust can lead to individuals being shielded from severe punishment for certain offenses. The latter communities are more accepting of some forms of criminal behavior. This means that trust and solidarity are likely to lead people to cooperate in order to protect individuals who engage in culturally accepted forms of crime. Consequently, individuals in communities that are tolerant of certain forms of crime will be more likely to commit these types of crime.

The above argument implies that social trust and solidarity can increase some forms of crime rather than reduce it if the community is accepting of those forms of crime. According to this "social cohesion" view, relationships between people can make crime more likely, which is the opposite argument to that made by proponents of collective efficacy theory.

The "social cohesion" argument is supported by a study undertaken in Chicago that shows that trust and cooperation are less likely to reduce crime in communities with high cohesion. This result suggests that whether community solidarity increases or reduces crime depends on whether community culture is more or less accepting of certain types of crime.
