= Rudolf Magnus =

German pharmacologist and physiologist

- Born: 2 September 1873
- Died: 25 July 1927 (aged 53)
- Awards: Cameron Prize for Therapeutics of the University of Edinburgh (1925)
- Scientific career
- Fields: Pharmacology; Physiology; Neurology

Rudolf Magnus (2 September 1873, Brunswick – 25 July 1927, Pontresina) was a German pharmacologist and physiologist. He studied medicine, specialising in pharmacology, in Heidelberg, where he became associate professor of pharmacology in 1904. In 1908 he became the first professor of pharmacology in Utrecht, where he spent the rest of his working life.

Had he lived, he likely would have been awarded the Nobel Prize for his work on animal reflexes. The authors of Nobel, the Man and his Prizes by H.Schück et al., edited by the Nobel Foundation (2nd ed. Amsterdam, 1962, p. 311) wrote of Magnus and his co-worker De Kleyn: ‘The examiner [1927] declared that the work done by Magnus and De Kleyn clearly deserved a prize, and the prospects for an award seemed most favourable when Magnus unexpectedly died.’ For his life and work see, Rudolf Magnus, Physiologist and Pharmacologist: A Biography (2002, Royal Netherlands Academy of Arts and Sciences) by his son, Dr.Otto Magnus.

Magnus had five children, Karl (1903-1989) lung specialist; Margarete (Gretl)(1905-1968)who worked as his secretary and translator; Dorothea who died aged 11; Erica (1909-1991) architect; and Otto (1913-2014) neurologist.

Magnus is most widely known for his work as a physiologist. His book Körperstellung ("Posture")., a study of functional neurology, is his best known work.

== Academic work ==
In 1901, while in Germany, Magnus discovered the diuretic effect of the excretions of the pituitary gland. From 1908, Rudolf Magnus worked on the physiology of posture and muscle tension. Although he was a pharmacologist, this research made him world famous. His most famous book, Körperstellung, was published in Berlin in 1924, and translated into English in 1987. In this book Magnus describes the reflexes involved in mammal posture. The Magnus & De Kleijn reflexes are named after Magnus and his colleague Adriaan de Kleijn (1883–1949). The head and neck reflexes of mammals cause the body to follow automatically when the head moves. He also researched the reflexes of the intestines and phenomena such as motion sickness.

In 1925, Magnus was awarded the Cameron Prize for Therapeutics of the University of Edinburgh.

The pharmacological research of Rudolf Magnus was focussed on the effect of medication on the heart, blood vessels, lungs and the gastrointestinal tract. Thus, he studied the effects of narcotics, as well as poison gasses on the lungs. He conducted the poison gas study during World War I (1914—1918) when he served as an army doctor in Germany.

Magnus was very fond of ice skating and would give his whole laboratory staff time off when the temperature was below freezing.

== Rudolf Magnus Institute ==
Originally the pharmacology department in Utrecht was housed in an old hospital for victims of the plague (built in 1567), named Leeuwenbergh. Magnus convinced the Rockefeller Foundation to give him the money to build a new laboratory. In 1926, Magnus laid the first stone for this new institute in Utrecht on the Vondellaan, named Nieuw Leeuwenbergh. In 1968, David de Wied renamed the building the Rudolf Magnus Institute. Due to his death in 1927 Rudolf Magnus never worked there himself. Today the building is no longer in use as a laboratory.

The Rudolf Magnus Institute for Neuroscience still exists and is one of the research institutes of the University Medical Center Utrecht, where neuroscientific research is performed. The Anatomical Museum in Utrecht houses Rudolf Magnus' archive.
