= Melly Oitzl =

Austrian neuroscientist

- Born: 1955 (age 70–71); Lind/Arnoldstein
- Education: University of Düsseldorf
- Scientific career
- Fields: Behavioural neuroscience
- Institutions: Leiden University
- Thesis: (1989)

Melly S. Oitzl (in full: Maria-Silvana Oitzl, born 1955 in Lind/Arnoldstein) is an Austrian behavioral neuroscientist. She is associate professor of medical pharmacology at Leiden University and adjunct professor of cognitive neurobiology at the University of Amsterdam. Oitzl is mainly interested in the relationships between stress, cognition, and emotion. She obtained her Ph.D. with the mention magna cum laude in 1989 from the University of Düsseldorf. Oitzl is a member of the board of the Earth and Life Sciences division of the Netherlands Organisation for Scientific Research, from which she had received an "Aspasia" grant in 2008. She has been a member of the executive committee and a treasurer of the European Brain and Behaviour Society. According to the Web of Science, Oitzl has published more than 130 articles in peer-reviewed scientific journals, which have been cited over 5000 times, with an h-index of 33.
