= Allostatic load =

Wear and tear on the body due to stress

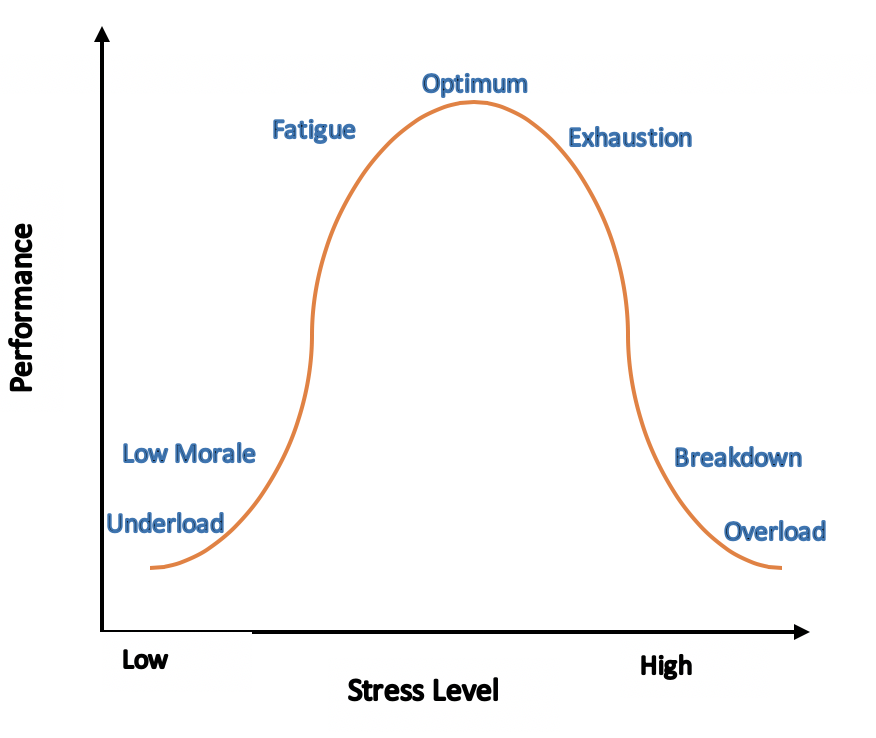
The graph represents the effect of increased stress on the performance of the body. The lower the stress levels are in the body, the less likely the allostatic load model will have a significant effect on the brain and health. An increase in stress levels results in an increase in stress on the brain and the health of individuals, making it more likely for the body to have significant effects on homeostasis and cause breakdown of the body systems.

Allostatic load is "the wear and tear on the body" which accumulates as an individual is exposed to repeated or chronic stress. The term was coined by Bruce McEwen and Eliot Stellar in 1993. It represents the physiological consequences of chronic exposure to fluctuating or heightened neural or neuroendocrine response which results from repeated or prolonged chronic stress.

== Regulatory model ==
Allostatic load is part of the regulatory model of allostasis, where the predictive regulation or stabilization of internal sensations in response to stimuli is ascribed to the brain. Allostasis involves the regulation of homeostasis in the body to decrease physiological consequences on the body. Predictive regulation refers to the brain's ability to anticipate needs and prepare to fulfill them before they arise.

Part of efficient regulation is the reduction of uncertainty. Humans are naturally averse to surprise; because of this, they constantly strive to reduce the uncertainty of future outcomes, and allostasis enables this by anticipating needs and planning how to satisfy them ahead of time. But it takes a considerable amount of the brain's energy to do this, and if it fails to resolve the uncertainty, the situation may become chronic and result in the accumulation of allostatic load.

The concept of allostatic load provides that "the neuroendocrine, cardiovascular, neuroenergetic, and emotional responses become persistently activated so that blood flow turbulences in the coronary and cerebral arteries, high blood pressure, atherogenesis, cognitive dysfunction, and depressed mood accelerate disease progression." All long-standing effects of continuously activated stress responses are referred to as allostatic load. Allostatic load can result in permanently altered brain architecture and systemic pathophysiology.

Allostatic load minimizes an organism's ability to cope with and reduce uncertainty in the future.

== Types ==
McEwen and Wingfield propose two types of allostatic load with different etiologies and distinct consequences:

Type 1 allostatic load occurs when energy demand exceeds supply, resulting in activation of the emergency life history stage. This serves to direct the animal away from normal life history stages into a survival mode that decreases allostatic load and regains positive energy balance. The normal life cycle can be resumed when the perturbation has passed. Typical situations ending up in type 1 allostasis are starvation, hibernation and critical illness. Of note, the life-threatening consequences of critical illness may be both cause and consequences of allostatic load.

Type 2 allostatic load results from sufficient or even excess energy consumption being accompanied by social conflict or other types of social dysfunction. The latter is the case in human society and certain situations affecting animals in captivity. In all cases, secretion of glucocorticosteroids and activity of other mediators of allostasis such as the autonomic nervous system, CNS neurotransmitters, and inflammatory cytokines wax and wane with allostatic load. If allostatic load is chronically high, then pathologies may develop. Type 2 allostatic overload does not trigger an escape response, and can only be counteracted through learning and changes in the social structure.

Whereas both types of allostatic load are associated with increased release of cortisol and catecholamines, they differentially affect thyroid homeostasis: Concentrations of the thyroid hormone triiodothyronine are decreased in type 1 allostasis, but elevated in type 2 allostasis. This may result from an interaction of type 2 allostatic load with the set point of thyroid function.

Special situations may involve a blend of both type 1 and type 2 allostatic load. Examples include exhausting exercise and adaptation to antarctic conditions.

== Measurement ==
Allostatic load is generally measured through a composite index of indicators of cumulative strain on several organs and tissues, primarily biomarkers associated with the neuroendocrine, cardiovascular, immune, and metabolic systems.

Indices of allostatic load are diverse across studies and are frequently assessed differently, using different biomarkers and different methods of assembling an allostatic load index. Allostatic load is not unique to humans and may be used to evaluate the physiological effects of chronic or frequent stress in non-human primates as well. The rat cumulative allostatic load measure (rCALM) is a marker for allostatic load in rodents.

In the endocrine system, the increase or repeated levels of stress results in elevated levels of the hormone Corticotropin-Releasing Factor (CRH), which is associated with activation of the HPA axis. The Hypothalamic–pituitary–adrenal axis is the central stress response system responsible for the modification of inflammatory responses throughout the body. Prolonged stress levels can lead to decreased levels of cortisol in the morning and increased levels in the afternoon, leading to greater daily output of cortisol which in the long term increases blood sugar levels.

In the nervous system, structural and functional abnormalities are a result of chronic prolonged stress. The increase in stress levels causes a shortening of dendrites in a neuron. Therefore, the shortening of dendrites causes a decrease in attention. Chronic stress also causes greater response to fear of the unlearned in the nervous system, and fear conditioning.

In the immune system, the increase in levels of chronic stress results in the elevation of inflammation. The increase in inflammation levels is caused by the ongoing activation of the sympathetic nervous system. The impairment of cell-mediated acquired immunity is also a factor resulting in the immune system due to chronic stress.

The R package pscore provides functions for simplified and automated calculation and statistical evaluation of physiological components of the metabolic syndrome symptom score (MSSS) and allostatic load.

== Relationship to allostasis and homeostasis ==
The largest contribution to the allostatic load is the effect of stress on the brain. Allostasis is the system which helps to achieve homeostasis. Homeostasis is the regulation of physiological processes, whereby systems in the body respond to the state of the body and to the external environment. The relationship between allostasis and allostatic load is the concept of anticipation. Anticipation can drive the output of mediators. Examples of mediators include hormones and cortisol. Excess amounts of such mediators will result in an increase in allostatic load, contributing to anxiety and anticipation.

Allostasis and allostatic load are related to the amount of health-promoting and health-damaging behaviors like for example cigarette smoking, consumption of alcohol, poor diet, and physical inactivity.

Three physiological processes cause an increase in allostatic load:

1. Frequent stress: the magnitude and frequency of response to stress is what determines the level of allostatic load which affects the body.
2. Failed shut-down: the inability of the body to shut off while stress accelerates and levels in the body exceed normal levels, for example, elevated blood pressure.
3. Inadequate response: the failure of the body systems to respond to challenge, for example, excess levels of inflammation due to inadequate endogenous glucocorticoid responses.

The importance of homeostasis is to regulate the stress levels encountered on the body to reduce allostatic load.

Dysfunctional allostasis causes allostatic load to increase which may, over time, lead to disease, sometimes with decompensation of the problem controlled by allostasis. Allostatic load effects can be measured in the body. When tabulated in the form of allostatic load indices using sophisticated analytical methods, it gives an indication of cumulative lifetime effects of all types of stress on the body.

== Causes of allostatic load ==
Type 1 allostatic load represents the adaptive response to an absolute lack in energy, glutathione, and several macronutrients. It also includes predictive responses (e.g., hibernation, infection, and depression).

Type 2 allostatic load results from an expected mismatch of energy demand and supply. It is triggered by psychosocial stressors such as low socioeconomic status, major life events, and environmental stressors. This association explains the increased risk for cardiovascular disease and chronic conditions like obesity, diabetes, hypertension, and psychotic conditions in subjects that were exposed to psychosocial trauma, social disadvantage, and discrimination. Socio-cultural mechanisms tend to augment this relation by perpetuating disparity even in the quality of health care, which tends to be inferior in socially disadvantaged population strata.

When the cumulation of stressful experiences leads to chronic exposure to fluctuations in neural or neuroendocrine responses, which surpass the individual's coping ability, the result is considered to be an allostatic load. Causing factors of allostatic load include the following: continual physiological arousal due to chronic stress, inadequate coping mechanisms, stress response continuing past the completion of a stressor, and an insufficient allostatic response to a stressor. A typical allostatic response has been initiated by a stressor and then continues for the duration of the stressor, in which it shuts off as the stressor has ended. Allostatic load is the accumulation of stressors and maladaptive responses that may result in an extreme state, where the stress response does not terminate.

The long-term impact of childhood adversity (e.g., abuse, neglect) has been shown to have lasting effects, including the increased risk for allostatic load in adulthood. Regardless of the type, an association between discrimination and allostatic load in adulthood has been found. Health risk behaviors, such as poor eating habits and obesity, physical inactivity, substance use, and sleep deprivation are also considered to be risk factors of allostatic load.

Extended activation of the hypothalamic-pituitary-adrenal axis (HPA), as well as the autonomic nervous system, can lead to negative impacts on biological health. Similarly, when the structural remodeling (e.g., cellular and molecular processes from the nucleus of a cell to the surface of a cell) of neural architecture, which is a key result of stress, continues past the termination of a stressor, the body is no longer maintaining a status of homeostasis and the extended stress response has negative implications. The human body regulates itself to maintain a status of homeostasis by utilizing allostatic mechanisms, but when there are extended stress responses that continue past the duration of the stressor's termination, it leads to the failure of these systems.

== Implications of allostatic load on health ==
Increased allostatic load constitutes a significant health hazard. Several studies documented a strong association of allostatic load to the incidence of coronary heart disease, to surrogate markers of cardiovascular health and to hard endpoints, including cause-specific and all-cause mortality. Mediators connecting allostatic load to morbidity and mortality include the function of the autonomic nervous system, cytokines, and stress hormones (e.g., catecholamines, cortisol, and thyroid hormones). Biological implications of allostatic load include impacts on both cognitive and physical functioning, with the prefrontal cortex, hippocampus, and amygdala being regions that may be specifically impacted by it.

== Reducing risk ==
To reduce and manage high allostatic load, an individual should pay attention to structural (e.g., social environment, access to health care) and behavioral factors (e.g., diet, physical health, and tobacco smoking, which can lead to chronic disease).

Low socio-economic status (SES) affects allostatic load and therefore, focusing on the causes of low SES may reduce allostatic load levels. Reducing societal polarization, material deprivation, and psychological demands on health assists to manage allostatic load. Support from the community and the social environment can manage high allostatic load. In addition, healthy lifestyle that encompasses a broad array of lifestyle change including healthy eating and regular physical exercise may reduce allostatic load. Empowering financial help from the government allows people to gain control and improve their psychological health. Improving inequalities in health decreases the stress levels and improves health by reducing high allostatic load on the body.

Interventions can include encouraging sleep quality and quantity, social support, self-esteem and wellbeing, improving diet, avoiding alcohol or drug consumption, and participating in physical activity. Providing cleaner and safer environments and the incentive towards a higher education will reduce the chance of stress and improve mental health significantly, therefore, reducing the onset of high allostatic load.

Allostatic load differs by sex, age, and the social status of an individual. Protective factors could, at various times of an individual's life span, be implemented to reduce stress and, in the long run, eliminate the onset of allostatic load. Protective factors include parental bonding, education, social support, healthy workplaces, a sense of meaning towards life and choices being made, and positive feelings in general.

== See also ==
- Holmes and Rahe Stress Scale
- Psychoneuroimmunology
- Shift-and-persist model
- Weathering hypothesis
- Autistic burnout
- Bruce McEwen
