= Heather Cameron (professor) =

British university teacher

- Education: University of Toronto (BA) York University, Toronto (MA, PhD)
- Occupations: Professor, Social Entrepreneur & Innovator
- Employer: Washington University in St. Louis
- Known for: Social Entrepreneurship & Innovation Lab at WashU, Boxgirls, Camp Group, Girls in the Lead, RespAct, Klima Kids, Expedition EV
- Website: heathercameron.eu

Heather Cameron is a Canadian-British global social innovator, academic, and social entrepreneur, blending theory, policy and grassroots action particularly in underserved or underrepresented communities, especially around community wealth building. She is the Michael B. Kaufman Professor of Practice for Social Entrepreneurship and Innovation at the Brown School at Washington University in St. Louis, where she also serves as the founding academic director of the Social Entrepreneurship and Innovation Lab, a joint initiative of the Brown School and Olin School of Business. From 2008 to 2016 she was an Assistant Professor of Physical Activity, Inclusion and Sport at the Department of Education and Psychology at the Freie Universität Berlin and Honorary Associate Professor Extraordinarius at the University of the Western Cape, South Africa.

== Education ==
Cameron earned a B.A. in philosophy and history at the University of Toronto before completing an M.A. and Ph.D. in social and political thought at York University, Toronto. Her doctoral dissertation was titled “Freud, Foucault and the Fate of Critique.” She also completed a graduate certificate in German and European studies at York University. From 2002 to 2004, she pursued postdoctoral research at the Technical University of Berlin, funded by the Canadian Social Science and Humanities Research Council and the Berlin Parliament Scholarship Fund.

== Academic career ==
Cameron began her faculty career at the Free University of Berlin (2008 - 2016), where she was a professor of education and social pedagogy, and also served as associate professor extraordinarius at the University of the Western Cape in South Africa. She held a postdoctoral award from the Canadian Social Sciences and Humanities Research Council at the Center for Technology and Society at the Technische Universität Berlin, and taught at the School of Communications at the Simon Fraser University, Vancouver, Canada.

In 2016, following a global search, she was appointed as the inaugural Michael B. Kaufman Professor of Practice in Social Entrepreneurship and Innovation Lab at Washington University in St. Louis. She holds a courtesy appointment at Olin Business School and is a Faculty Fellow at the Institute for Public Health. She teaches courses in social entrepreneurship, social innovation, strategic planning, gender, and urban planning. She has also co-taught in the Beyond Boundaries program.

She has served as an external examiner at the University of Hong Kong and advised numerous international organizations, including UN Women, GIZ (German International Development Cooperation), and the German Ministry of Economic Cooperation and Development.

== Social Entrepreneurship ==
Cameron is the founder of multiple social enterprises in education and is a leader in the sport for social development movement. In 2000, she founded Boxgirls International using boxing as a tool for girls’ empowerment and community cohesion, with programs in Germany, Kenya, and South Africa. It has been cited as a case study in social entrepreneurship by the IOC and UN Women.

She is a leader in the Sport for Social Development movement and was a founding member of the "Sport for Social Change Network" in East and South Africa and was an early advisory board member to the International Foundation for Women's Sports "Women Win” initiative.

Boxgirls is a project of Camp Group, a think and do tank founded in 2013, that helps communities overcome critical social problems, and provides consulting services and expertise to schools, nonprofits, and non-governmental organizations. They deliver training, mentorship, and social programs, especially focused on young people from marginalized backgrounds, to improve their skills and opportunities, for example in Kenya and South Africa. In 2016, Camp Group won the Google Impact Challenge Germany for its educational app for refugee children. Boxgirls has been included as a case study by the IOC and UN Women.

Her more recent initiatives include Girls in the Lead and RespAct, both of which promote equity, education, and participation through sports and community engagement. She works with the German International Development Cooperation on behalf of the German and Afghan governments to support girls education and sport in Afghanistan.

At Washington University in St. Louis, Cameron manages the Social Entrepreneurship and Innovation Lab, which works on questions of community advancement through entrepreneurship.

== Research ==
Cameron's research spans social entrepreneurship, social innovation, education, and impact investing. She has published with the Federal Reserve Bank of St. Louis on social finance and is principal investigator on Capital Access Prosperity, a project funded by the Kauffman Foundation to explore equitable funding models for Black and Latinx entrepreneurs.

== Awards ==
- 2016 Google Impact Challenge Germany for Camp Group
- 2012 Member of The Robert Bosch Stiftung (Responsible Bosch Foundation)
- 2011 Special Recognition Award, BMW Herbert Quandt Foundation Young Leaders Award BMW
- 2010 University Teacher of the Year by the German Association of University Professors and Lecturers.
- 2010 German Chancellor's Award for Excellence, Start Social
- 2010 Ashoka Fellow

== Selected publications ==
- Innovative Approaches to Investing with Impact in St. Louis, Federal Reserve Bank of St. Louis. April 2019
- Who determines when social entrepreneurs are successful? in Marianne Henkel, Jana Gebauer, Justus Lodemann, Franziska Mohaupt, Lena Partzsch, Eva Wascher, Rafael Ziegler (ed.): Social Entrepreneurship - Status Quo 2009: (Self) image, impact and future responsibility, conference proceedings. Berlin HUB, June 16 and 17, 2009. Geozon Science Media, ISBN 978-3-941971-02-8 , doi : 10.3285 / g.00003, pp. 111–126, PDF (1.69 MB)
- Sport is good! Monitoring sport for social change, in International - Inclusive - Interdisciplinary. Perspectives of Contemporary Sports Science. Ed .: Heike Tiemann, Sigrun Schulz & Erika Schmidt-Gotz. Schorndorf 2007.
- Tracking Buses and Passengers with Intelligent Transport Systems, in Surveillance and Security: Technological Politics and Power in Everyday Life. New York 2006, ISBN 978-0415953931
- Directing Traffic: Surveillance in Beijing, Amsterdam, London, in Alphabet City 10: Supect. Boston: MIT Press 2005.
- The Next Generation: visual surveillance in the age of databases and radio labels, in image, space, control. Frankfurt a. M. 2005.
- CCTV and (In) dividuation In: Surveillance & Society. November 2004.
- Planning, Design, and Validation Issues in Assistive Technology: State of the Art and New Participative Tools (in collaboration with H – L. Dienel and Alexander Peine). In: Gerotechnology: Research and Practice in Technology and Aging: A Textbook and Reference for Multiple Disciplines. Heidelberg 2004.
- Watching the boxer's body, in sport, staging, event, art. Kiel 2004.
- Expert Witnesses as Engaged Intellectuals: A discussion with Janine Fuller of Little Sisters, in Canadian Woman Studies. May 1996.
