= Heather Cameron (neuroscientist) =

American neuroscientist

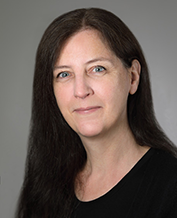
- Other name: Heather A. Cameron
- Education: Yale College; Rockefeller University
- Children: 3
- Scientific career
- Fields: Neurogenesis, neuroplasticity
- Workplaces: National Institute of Mental Health
- Doctoral advisor: Bruce McEwen

Heather A. Cameron is an American neuroscientist who researches adult neurogenesis and diseases involving the hippocampus. She is the chief of the neuroplasticity section at the National Institute of Mental Health.

== Life ==
Dr. Cameron received a B.S. in biology from Yale College. She earned a Ph.D. in neuroscience from the Rockefeller University, where she worked with Bruce McEwen and Elizabeth Gould examining neurogenesis in the adult rat dentate gyrus. Her 1995 dissertation was titled, Regulation of adult neurogenesis in the rat dentate gyrus by adrenal steroids and excitatory input. Bruce McEwen was her doctoral advisor. In 1995, she came to the National Institutes of Health (NIH) during a postdoctoral fellowship with Ronald D.G. McKay at National Institute of Neurological Disorders and Stroke (NINDS). Her postdoctoral research determined the magnitude of adult neurogenesis in the dentate gyrus and investigated the effects of stress hormones on neurogenesis in the aging rat hippocampus.

Dr.Cameron joined the Mood and Anxiety Disorders Program at National Institute of Mental Health (NIMH) as an investigator in 2001. By 2014, she was the chief of the section on neuroplasticity. Her laboratory studies the regulation of adult neurogenesis and the role of the newly born neurons in normal hippocampal function as well as in diseases involving the hippocampus. In 2014, Cameron was an associate editor of The Journal of Neuroscience. In 2020, she worked alongside fellow neuroscientists Jenny Kim and Nicholas Bulthuis to examine the effects of certain anesthesia on the hippocampus neurogenesis in rats, concluding that different anesthesias do affect adult neurogenesis, though the effects vary widely from drug to drug.
