= Haim Bejarano =

Sephardic rabbi (d. 1931)

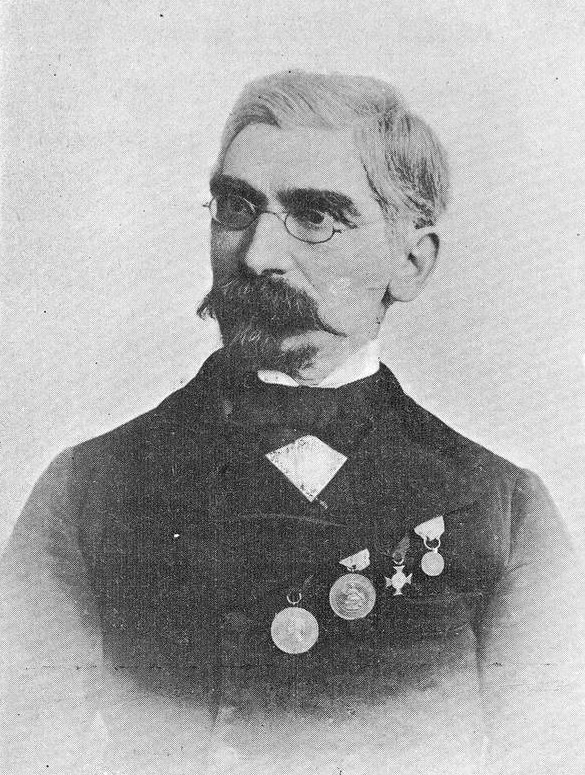
- Bejarano in 1904

Personal life
- Born: c. 1846 Stara Zagora, Danube vilayet
- Died: August 23, 1931 (aged 85)
- Buried: Ulus Sephardi Jewish Cemetery

Religious life
- Religion: Judaism

Rabbi Enrique Bekhor Haim Moshe Bejarano (Hebrew: אנריקה בכור חיים משה בז'רנו; c. 1846 – August 23, 1931) was a Sephardic Jewish Torah scholar from Bulgaria. He was a Hebrew poet and a scholar of the Ladino language. He lived and worked for many years in Romania and Ottoman Turkey, and led the Sephardic community in Bucharest for 32 years, later serving as acting rabbi of Turkey.

== Early life ==
Bejarano was born in Stara Zagora during the Danube vilayet period of Bulgaria. He was the son of Moshe Bejarano and Kalo (née Calderon). Kalo was the daughter of Rabbi Yitzchak Baruch of Pleven. On his father's side, he is a relative of Sabetay Djaen through Djaen's mother Malka. His family, the Bejaranos, are theorized to have originated from the city of Béjar in Castile, but others disagree and believe the city of origin to be Beja, Portugal.

As a child, he studied Torah with his maternal grandfather, Rabbi Yitzchak Baruch Calderon, and when he turned 12, he moved back to his parents. When he completed his studies across several yeshivas, including with Rabbi Nissim Alkalai, by the age of 17, he was ordained a rabbi. He began his work in the city of Ruse, Bulgaria, where he taughtin a Talmud Torah. One of his students was Salomon Abraham Rosanes. During this period, he also studied English, French, and German, and taught Hebrew at Alliance Israélite Universelle.

During the Russo-Turkish War in the 1870s, the city of Ruse was surrounded and occupied by the Imperial Russian Army, and his mother was killed by shelling from bullets. He chose to then flee with the rest of his family, as well as that of Jacob Levy Moreno, to Romania.

== Work in Romania ==
Bejarano arrived in Bucharest in 1878 as a refugee and served as a rabbi and preacher in the Sephardic synagogue in the city. He held the position for a total of 32 years. He was also a director for the boys' school of the Sephardic community, and taught Hebrew in 1896 in the theology department at the University of Bucharest. He became close to the maskilim in the region and to the ideas of the Jewish Enlightenment itself. He took an active part in the establishment of the Historical Society by Dr. Iuliu Barasch, which dealt with the history of Romanian Jewry. Historian Grigore Tochilescu invited him to the university to translate inscriptions of gravestones in Hebrew, Turkish, and Arabic. He approved the construction of a restoration for the Kahal Grande and a rededication took place around 1890. Two years later, an organ was added to the synagogue to play a musical accompaniment on Shabbos and other holidays.

He was often a guest at the King's Palace as a guest of Queen Elisabeth (Isabel) of Wied, who appreciated his wisdom. Due to his knowledge of French, English, German, Italian, Turkish, Persian, and Arabic, he sometimes acted as an interpreter for the Foreign Ministry and the court of the King. He also assisted Romanian General Vasile Herescu-Năsturel in recording the history of the Romanian War of Independence, helping translate inscriptions and documents from Turkish, Persian, and Arabic.

He was an early supporter of Hovevei Zion in Romania and corresponded with other intellectuals including Theodore Herzl, Max Nordau, and Eliezer Ben-Yehuda. He was an advocate for the importance of Sephardic pronunciation of Hebrew, and published articles in contemporary Hebrew newspapers such as Hamagid and Habazeleth, as well as Ladino newspapers Telegraph and El Tiempo. He also wrote for Romanian newspapers Albina, Egalitatea, Revista Israelită, and Adevărul.

In Romania, he was honored with the Knight of the Romanian Crown. He was praised by Ernest Renan for his French-to-Hebrew translation of Jules Simon's Natural Religion. He was also active in the Italian language and culture dissemination society of Dante Alighieri.

== Chief Rabbi of Turkey ==
After 1910, Bejarano moved to Edirne in Thrace, on the border with Bulgaria, where he served as the community's chief rabbi. He established a Jewish school there and tried to help the Jews of the city during the Balkan Wars, which devastated local populations. After the retirement of Rabbi Chaim Nahum as Chief Rabbi of Turkey, in 1920, Bejarano moved to Istanbul and was elected as the acting Chief Rabbi Kaymakam of Turkey.

He lived in what is widely regarded as a transition period between the Ottoman Empire and the Modern Turkish Republic. As a member of that transitional generation of Sephardic Jewry, he participated in both Halakhic tradition, as well as an affection for Eretz Yisroel and modern culture. He corresponded with many modern intellectuals, including: Anatole France, Georges Clemenceau, Moses Gaster, Hayim Nahman Bialik, and many others.

He is credited with having inspired Spanish politician Ángel Pulido with working to reconcile Spaniards with descendants of Sephardi Jews who were expelled from Spain during the Spanish Inquisition.

== Cultivation of Ladino ==
While on vacation, Bejarano was sailing on the Danube. Another passenger, Dr. Ángel Pulido Fernández, a Spanish senator, heard him speaking to his wife in an ancient Spanish language, Ladino. They began a relationship, and Pulido, inspired by the language, devoted himself to the reconciliation of Spaniards to Sephardic Jews who were descended from the exiles of the Spanish Inquisition.

He is also the author of a collection of Ladino proverbs that contains more than 3,600 sayings of Sephardic Jews. Among the songs he composed in Ladino, many express longing for a return to Spain and a love of the Ladino language. His poem in praise of Ladino was real aloud in 1903 at a session of the Spanish Senate by Pulido.

For his contribution to the study of Jewish Sephardic poetry, Bejarano was honored by Bialik. He was elected a correspondence member of the Spanish Royal Academy. His daughter, Diamante, collected her father's works and donated them to the Arias Montano Institute in Madrid, at the time run by Jacob M. Hassan.

Bejarano was married to Reina Asa, and had eight children: three sons: Marin, Sever, and Jacques, and five daughters: Boka, Rosa, Rachel, Blina, and Diamanti Baratz. He died in Istanbul on August 23, 1931.

== Sources ==
- Herşcovici, Lucian-Zeev; Tercatin, Baruch (2008). Prezenţe rabinice în perimetrul românesc : secolele XVI-XXI (in Romanian). Bucharest: Hasefer.
