= National Anti-Masonic and Anti-semitic League =

The National Anti-Masonic and Anti-semitic League was a Spanish anti-masonic and antisemitic organization founded in 1912 by the Catholic and Carlist José Ignacio de Urbina. He opposed the pro-Sephardic campaign of Dr. Ángel Pulido and was supported by twenty-two bishops through letters published in the League's newspaper El Previsor, directed by Urbina himself between May 1912 and February 1918.

== History ==
After the founding of the League, Urbiina took control of El Previsor, a former insurance magazine. Between May 1912 and February 1918, the magazine provided economic information and carried out its campaign to "denounce" the Judeo-Masonic conspiracy theory. It received its main support from twenty-two Catholic bishops through letters published in El Previsor. The Bishop of Almería, for example, said "It seems that everything is prepared for the decisive battle that must be fought between the children of light and the children of darkness, between Catholicism and Judaism, between Christ and Belial."

Between May 1912 and February 1918, the magazine published many articles expressly directed against Pulido's pro-Sephardic campaigns and against the granting of the chair of Hebrew and Rabbinic Literature at the Central University of Madrid to the Jewish Abraham Yahuda. Common antisemitic tropes were used such as blood libel and idea of a Judeo-Masonic plot to destroy Catholicism.
