= Jonathan D. Moreno =

American philosopher and historian (born 1952)

- Born: June 11, 1952 (age 74)

Philosophical work
- Main interests: Bioethics, neuroethics, history of science, philosophy, national security
- Notable ideas: Bioethical naturalism, neurosecurity

Jonathan D. Moreno (born June 11, 1952) is an American philosopher and historian who specializes in the intersection of bioethics, culture, science, and national security, and has published seminal works on the history, sociology and politics of biology and medicine. He is an elected member of the National Academy of Medicine.

Moreno is the David and Lyn Silfen University Professor Emeritus at the University of Pennsylvania, where he was also a faculty affiliate of the Center for Neuroscience and Society, the Warren Center for Network and Data Sciences, and the Center for Ethics and the Rule of Law. Before going emeritus, he was also a professor of medical ethics and health policy, of history and sociology of science, and of philosophy.

== Early life and education ==
Jonathan D. Moreno was born and grew up in New York's Hudson Valley. His father, Jacob Levy Moreno, was a psychiatrist and the pioneer of psychodrama and sociometry, the precursor of social network theory. His mother was psychotherapist Zerka T. Moreno. Both of his parents emigrated to the United States from Europe before World War II.

Moreno attended Hofstra University where he earned a B.A. in philosophy and psychology with highest honors in 1973. From 1973 to 1975 he was a graduate student in the philosophy doctoral program in the CUNY Graduate Center and completed his Ph.D. in philosophy at Washington University in St. Louis in 1977. Moreno's doctoral dissertation traced the development of a distinctly American semiotic tradition from Charles Sanders Peirce to Nelson Goodman. His dissertation director was Richard S. Rudner, the longtime editor of the Journal of the Philosophy of Science.

== Career ==
Following graduation, Moreno held full-time academic appointments in philosophy at Swarthmore College, the University of Texas at Austin, and George Washington University. During 1984–85 he was an associate at the Hastings Center, the first bioethics think tank. From 1985 to 1987, he was philosopher-in-residence at the Children's National Medical Center in Washington, DC.

He was the founding director of the Program in Medical Humanities and a professor of pediatrics and medicine at the SUNY Health Science Center in Brooklyn from 1989 until 1998, when he joined the University of Virginia faculty as the Emily Davie and Joseph S. Kornfeld Professor of Biomedical Ethics and director of the Center for Biomedical Ethics. In 1994, Moreno was a senior staff member of President Bill Clinton's special commission to investigate allegations of governments-sponsored radiation on unknowing citizens during the Cold War, which would lay the groundwork for Undue Risk.

In 2007, Moreno joined the faculty at the University of Pennsylvania as part of President Amy Gutmann's Penn Integrates Knowledge (PIK) Initiative, where he was the David and Lyn Silfen University Professor and a professor of medical ethics and health policy and of the History and Sociology of Science until June 2024. He is now the David and Lyn Silfen University Professor Emeritus. He also held a courtesy appointment in Penn's Department of Philosophy, and was a member of the Center for Neuroscience and Society and the Warren Center for Network and Data Sciences. He was the interim chair of the Department of Medical Ethics and of the program in science, technology, and society in the School of Arts and Sciences.

Moreno has served as senior staff member or adviser to many governmental and non-governmental organizations on bioethics, embryonic stem cell research, national defense research, and neuroscience, including three U.S. presidential commissions, the Howard Hughes Medical Institute, and the Bill and Melinda Gates Foundation. In 2008-2009, he served as a member of Barack Obama's transition team. His work has been cited by Al Gore and was used in the development of the screenplay for The Bourne Legacy.

He is also a past president of the American Society for Bioethics and Humanities, and was a Fellow of the New York Academy of Medicine. A former senior fellow at the Center for American Progress, Moreno was the editor of Science Progress, an online journal focusing on progressive science and technology policy. He was co-host of Making the Call, an Endeavor Content podcast covering COVID-19 with his colleague, Dr. Zeke Emanuel.

Since 2023, he has been a member of the Committee on Human Rights in the National Academies of Sciences, Engineering and Medicine (NASEM). Since 2021, he has served on the Bioethics Council of Bayer AG in Berlin, Germany and the Advisory Board of the Central European University Center for Ethics and Law in Biomedicine. Since 2025, he has served on the Bioethics Advisory Committee of the FujiFilm Biosciences Division. He is a fellow at The Hastings Center for Bioethics.

== Academic work ==
His most recent book is Absolutely Essential: Bioethics and the Rules-Based International Order, published by MIT Press in 2024. Everybody Wants to Go to Heaven but Nobody Wants to Die: Bioethics and the Transformation of Healthcare in America, co-authored with former Penn president Amy Gutmann, was published in 2019. In 2020, The Brain in Context: A Pragmatic Guide to Neuroscience, co-authored with neuroscientist Jay Schulkin, was published. Everybody Wants to Go To Heaven but Nobody Wants to Die was translated into Korean and published by Humanitas Publishing Co. in 2021, and The Brain in Context was translated into Japanese and published by Newton Press in 2021.

Moreno's book, Undue Risk: Secret State Experiments on Humans, was published in 1999 by W.H. Freeman Publishers and nominated for the Los Angeles Times Book Prize and the Virginia Literary Award. In Undue Risk, Moreno presented the first comprehensive history of the use of human subjects in atomic, biological, and chemical warfare experiments from World War II to the 21st Century, from the courtrooms of Nuremberg to the battlefields of the Gulf War. The Body Politic: The Battle Over Science in America was published by Bellevue Literary Press in 2011 and was included in the Best Books of 2011 by Kirkus Reviews. The Body Politic received a starred Kirkus Review and discussed the intersection of science and politics in American history and modern American life, in which he coined the term "biopolitics" to designate the unique role science and scientific progress play in the contemporary political battleground. Mind Wars: Brain Science and the Military in the 21st Century was published by Bellevue Literary Press in 2012, having been revised and updated from Mind Wars: Brain Research and National Defense (2006). In Mind Wars, Moreno covered the history of technology and neuroscience developed for military applications and their ethical dilemmas, and the implications of modern science and technology on national security.

He was an investigator on a $1.1 million Minerva Research Initiative project on artificial intelligence and warfighters from 2019-2023, and senior consultant to a six-year, 10 million-euro project on Cold War medical science on both sides of the Iron Curtain, funded by the European Research Council. He has written on the bioethical implications of the pandemic and the Russian invasion of Ukraine for the rules-based international order.

== Awards and honors ==
Describing him as "one of the world's foremost experts in bioethics and politics and bioethics in national security", the American Society for Bioethics and Humanities awarded him its 2018 Lifetime Achievement Award, the highest honor of this Society, which recognizes a "distinguished individual" for excellence in bioethics and is given in recognition for "long standing achievement in the field".

Moreno also holds an honorary doctorate from Hofstra University, and is a recipient of the College of William and Mary Law School Benjamin Rush Medal, the Dr. Jean Mayer Award for Global Citizenship from Tufts University, and the Penn Alumni Faculty Award of Merit. He has held the honorary Visiting Professorship in History at the University of Kent in Canterbury, England. His book, The Body Politic, was named as a Best Book of 2011 by Kirkus Reviews, and was a Top 26 Book in the Book Expo America, New York City in that year.

His book Mind Wars: Brain Science and the Military in the 21st Century, which covers the ethical dilemmas and bizarre history of cutting-edge technology and neuroscience developed for military applications, was referenced by the screenwriter of The Bourne Legacy to develop the screenplay.

== Selected publications ==
=== Articles ===
- "Harvard's Experiment on the Unabomber, Class of '62." Psychology Today (May 25, 2012).

=== Books ===
- Absolutely Essential: Bioethics and the Rules-Based International Order. Cambridge, Ma.: MIT Press, (2024).
- The Brain in Context: A Pragmatic Guide to Neuroscience (with J. Schulkin). New York: Columbia University Press (2020). Japanese translation: Newton Press (2021).
- Everybody Wants to Go to Heaven but Nobody Wants to Die: Bioethics and the Transformation of Health Care in America (with A. Gutmann). New York: Liveright/Norton (2019); paperback (2020). Korean translation: Humanitas Publishing Co. (2021).
- Global Bioethics: The Impact of the UNESCO International Bioethics Committee (with A. Bagheri and S. Semplici). New York: Springer (2016).
- Impromptu Man: J.L. Moreno and the Origins of Psychodrama, Encounter Culture, and the Social Network. New York: Bellevue Literary Press (2014). Portuguese translation: Brazilian Psychodrama Federation (FEBRAP) (2016). Romanian translation: Editura Hasefer (2019).
- Mind Wars: Brain Science and the Military in the 21st Century. New York: Bellevue Literary Press (2012). Revised and updated. Originally published as Mind Wars: Brain Research and National Defense. Washington, D.C.: Dana Press (2006). Japanese translation: ASCII Corporation (2008). Chinese translation: Chinese People's Military Medical Press, in press.
- Progress in Bioethics: Science, Policy and Politics (with S. Berger). Cambridge: The MIT Press (2012).
- The Body Politic: The Battle over Science in America. New York: Bellevue Literary Press (2011).
- Progress in Bioethics: Science, Policy and Politics (with S. Berger). Cambridge: The MIT Press (2010).
- Science Next: Big Ideas for the American Future (with R. Weiss). New York: Bellevue Literary Press (2009).
- Ethical Guidelines for Innovative Surgery (with A.R. Reitsma). Frederick, Md.: University Publishing Group (2006).
- Is There an Ethicist in the House? On the Cutting Edge of Bioethics. Bloomington, Indiana: Indiana University Press (2005).
- Ethical and Regulatory Aspects of Clinical Research: Readings and Commentary (with E. Emanuel, R. Crouch, J. Arras, and C. Grady). Baltimore: Johns Hopkins University Press (2003).
- National Defense and Human Research Protections (with A.E. Shamoo). New York: Taylor & Francis (2003).
- In the Wake of Terror: Medicine and Morality in a Time of Crisis. Cambridge: The MIT Press (2003); paperback (2004).
- Shamoo A.E. and Moreno J.D. (eds.) Business and Research: Proceedings of the Third National Conference on the Business of Human Experiments: Ethical, Legal, and Regulatory Issues. New York: Taylor & Francis (2002).
- Undue Risk: Secret State Experiments on Humans. New York: W.H. Freeman Publishers (1999); New York: Routledge (2001).
- Ethics in Clinical Practice, with J. Ahronheim and C. Zuckerman. Little, Brown and Co. (1994); 2nd ed.: Aspen Publishers (2000); paperback: Sudbury, Ma.: Jones and Bartlett Publishers (2005).
- Arguing Euthanasia: The Controversy Over Mercy Killing, Assisted Suicide and the Right to Die. New York: Simon & Schuster (1995). Japanese translation: Mita Industries, Ltd. (1997).
- Deciding Together: Bioethics and Moral Consensus. New York: Oxford University Press (1995).
- Jacob L. Moreno: Auszuge aus der Autobiographie. Koln: InScenario (1995).
- Paying the Doctor: Health Policy and Physician Reimbursement. Dover, Mass.: Auburn House (1991).
- The Qualitative-Quantitative Distinction in the Social Sciences, Vol. 112 (with B. Glassner). Boston Studies in the Philosophy of Science. Dordrecht, Netherlands: Kluwer Academic Publishers (1989).
- The Public Humanities: An Old Role in Contemporary Perspective (with R. S. French). Washington, DC: George Washington University (1984).
- Discourse in the Social Sciences: Translating Models of Mental Illness (with B. Glassner). Westport, Conn.: Greenwood Press (1982).
