= Sabetay Djaen =

Bulgarian-Argentinian rabbi (1883–1947)

Rabbi Sabetay Djaen
- Šabetaj Josef Đaen
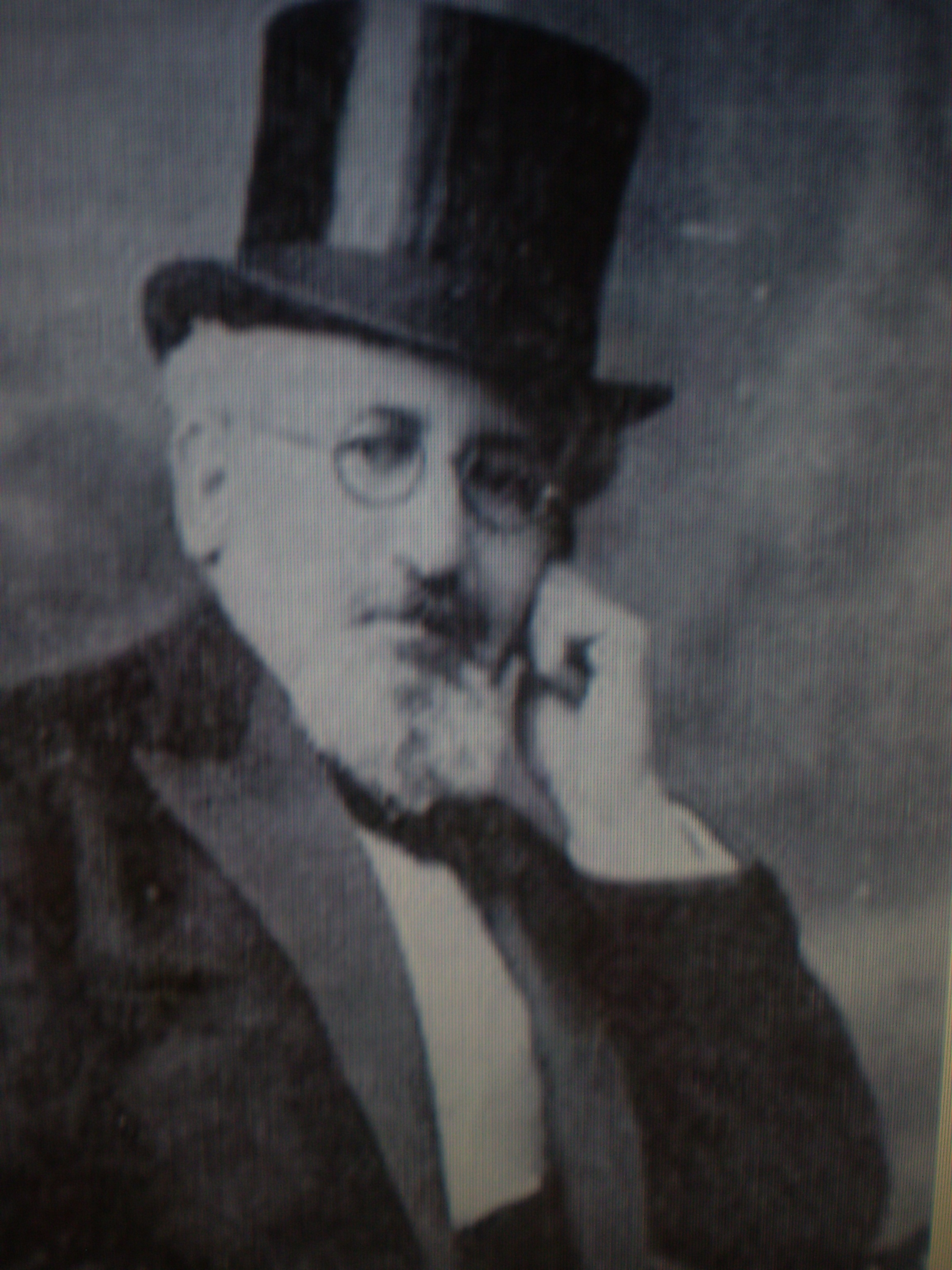
- Djaen c. 1925
- Born: 1883; Plevna, Principality of Bulgaria, Ottoman Empire
- Died: November 10, 1947 (aged 63–64); San Miguel de Tucumán, Argentina
- Occupations: Author, educator
- Title: Chief Rabbi of Argentina and Uruguay
- Term: 1929–1931

Sabetay Josef Djaen (Serbian: Šabetaj Josef Đaen; 1883 – November 10, 1947) was a Bulgarian-born Sephardic rabbi active in Macedonia, Romania, Argentina, Uruguay, and Chile. He was an author, playwright, educator, and columnist in both Ladino and Serbian. He was one of the central figures of the Sephardic Jewish diaspora between the two world wars. His family originally came from the Andalusian city of Jaén, where his family originated before their expulsion. He served as Chief Rabbi of Sephardic Jews in Argentina and Uruguay from 1929 to 1931 and Chief Rabbi of the Sephardic community of Bucharest from 1931 to 1944.

== Biography ==
Djaen was born in Pleven, Ottoman Empire in 1883 to Joseph Djaen and Malka Bejarano. He was known for his adventurous spirit and people knew him as a tireless traveler. He studied at the seminary of the Alliance Israélite Universelle in Istanbul under Rabbi Abraham Danon. He became a citizen of Serbia and studied philosophy at the University of Belgrade.

=== Activity in Bosnia and Serbia ===
When he was a young man, he accompanied the first Bosnian and Serbian emigrants to Ottoman Palestine, and later returned to the city of Niš where he taught Hebrew to the Sephardi community. He founded two youth organizations in Belgrade: Gideon for high schoolers and Hathaya for working youth. With funding from his community, he travelled to Jerusalem to study Torah.

He later served as a cantor and rabbi. He lived a large part of his life in the Balkans, mainly in the Kingdom of Serbia and in the Kingdom of Romania. During World War I, he lived in Austrian Bosnia in Sarajevo and Travnik. At an early age, he excelled as a journalist and was an editor at the Serbian newspaper "Verma" in Belgrade.

=== Chief Rabbi of Monastir ===
At the suggestion of the Chief Rabbi of Sephardi Jews in Yugoslavia, Rabbi Alkalai, Djaen settled in Monastir in Macedonia, where he returned to the Balkans. He served from 1925 to 1928 as chief rabbi of the community. He worked tirelessly to create a national consciousness among Sephardi Jewry across the globe. He was one of the founders of the World Confederation of Sephradi Jews established at the Vienna conference in 1925. With support from the government in Belgrade, he toured across Sephardi communities in the Americas. During his trip, he raised money for children who were orphaned in the Balkan Wars and for the poor Jews of Monastir, as well as the renovation of its Jewish cemetery. In support of Reform Judaism, he advocated to remove the mechitza from Kahal Aragon. He also established its first Jewish kindergarten.

=== South America ===
In 1928, Djaen immigrated to Argentina, where he served as its Chief Sephardic Rabbi from 1929 to 1931. During his term, Djaen spoke at the inauguration of the Great Synagogue in Corrientes. He made great efforts to unite Sephardic communities in the country during that time. In 1928, he established a Sephardic rabbinate in Argentina, but it disbanded after 2 years. He promoted the study of Hebrew, and directed and wrote the Ladino play, "Esther". He visited Talmud Torah classes and distributed gifts to high-achieving students, He founded a Sephardic Jewish youth club, and often visited each community in the area, attempting to document each community and their institutions.

In 1929, he visited the province of Araucanía in Chile for the city of Temuco, where some Jews from Monastir had immigrated. He succeeded in uniting the local Jews into one singular community. As a gesture of gratitude, the Jews of the Yishuv elected him honorary chairman of the new community. Djaen worked diligently in collaboration with Spanish Christian academics Dr. Ángel Pulido Fernández and Rafael Cansinos-Asséns in Spanish to renew relations between Jews and non-Jews in the country while also improving rights of the locals.

For the renewal of said relations of Spain and Sephardic Jews, he visited Spain in 1931 and met with Spanish Foreign Minister Alejandro Lerroux and the chairman of the Spanish Jewish community, Ignacio Bauer. During his tenure as Chief Sephardic Rabbi in Buenos Aires, a dispute arose in conservative circles over his more modern religious authority.

=== Chief Rabbi in Romania ===
For nearly a decade from 1921 to 1930, the Sephardic community in Romania did not have its own rabbi. In 1930, Djaen was elected the Mare Rabin (lit. 'Grand Rabbi') of the Sephardic communities in the country and served from 1931 to 1944. His inauguration was celebrated at the Kahal Grande Synagogue on September 5, 1931. He was highly respected, and apart from cultural aspirations, include lectures on history and philosophy, he was charitable in the field of welfare. He was an active participant at the head of the Union of Sephardic Communities along with Yosef Pinchas.

He established a Jewish studies class at the Yeshiva hall of the Kahal Grande for the first time since Rabbi Jacob Itzhak Niemirower's tenure before the community. During the period of intensification of anti-Jewish sentiments in Romania during the 2nd World War, he was arrested multiple times. He was first arrested during the Legionnaires' rebellion and Bucharest pogrom of January 1941, but he survived. He oversaw the destruction of the Grand Temple by rioters. He was one of the Jewish leaders taken hostage and put at threat of execution under "hostile behavior against the Romanian people." The Rabbi collaborated with Niemirower and Alexandru Șafran to organize aid for Romanian Jews and exiles. Together with Șafran, in September 1940, he appealed to new Romanian dictator Ion Antonescu to request that he rescind the decree to close synagogues through the country. The appeal was partially successful.

In 1944, when the fate of Romanian Jewry was not certain, the rabbi managed to escape from Romania thanks to Chilean Consul-General Miguel Ángel Rivera González. He was succeeded in the Sephardic community of Bucharest by Rabbi Mordechai Ashkenazi.

=== Final years ===
After leaving Romania in 1944, Djaen briefly visited British Palestine and returned two years later to Argentina. In Buenos Aires, he worked at the Sephardic synagogues on Camargo Street and the Shalom Synagogue on Olleros Street. He died in San Miguel de Tucumán in 1947. His grandson, Ricardo Jain, immigrated to the United States and was involved in the publication of his grandfather's writings.

== Literary work ==
Djaen clung to his Ladino heritage throughout his life and wrote songs in his language, as well as around 20 plays. In 1904, he presented some of his plays for the first time with his students at a Jewish school in Travnik in Bosnia. His work, Bar Kochba was exhibited on the occasion of the inauguration of a new Sephardic synagogue in the nearby city of Zenica. Three of his plays were published in Vienna in 1922. His theatrical works were published again in Argentina in 2007 by researchers Amor Ayala and Aldina Quintana of the Free University of Berlin and Hebrew University of Jerusalem.
