= Marion Palfi =

- Born: October 21, 1907; Berlin, Germany
- Died: November 4, 1978; Los Angeles, CA
- Known for: Photography
- Spouse(s): Erich Abraham, Benjamin Weiss, Martin Magner
- Awards: Rosenwald fellowship; Guggenheim Fellowship, 1967; National Endowment for the Arts fellowship, 1974

Marion Palfi (1907–1978) was a German-American social-documentary photographer born in Berlin. In 1940 she moved from Germany to New York City to escape the Nazi army and their ideologies.

== Early life ==
Palfi was the daughter of German theater designer, Victor Palfi (1877–1921), and a Polish mother. She studied dance at private schools in Germany, and as a young woman she worked as a model, dancer, and actress, appearing in at least one film in 1926. In rejection of Germany's radical politics, she began to use photography and art to effect social change.

== Career ==
In 1932, Palfi became an apprentice at a commercial portrait studio in Berlin and also began working as a freelance magazine photographer. Two years later, she opened her own portrait studio there. Fleeing the Nazis in Berlin, she opened her own successful portrait studio in Amsterdam in 1936. She then fled Europe for the United States in 1940 after marrying an American soldier, Benjamin Weiss.

In the U.S., Palfi supported herself by working in a photo-finishing lab in New York City and began working on a large project of photographic essays celebrating American minority artists. Great American Artists of Minority Groups (1945) opened doors for her: after meeting Langston Hughes and Arna Bontemps, Palfi was asked to photograph for a number of African American Causes. One of her photographs was published on the cover of the first issue of Ebony magazine, featuring the Henry Street Settlement of New York's Lower East Side.

Palfi was granted an award from the Rosenwald Fellowship in 1946. Between the years of 1946-1949, Palfi used photography to catalog racial discrimination in the United States. Palfi's photographic study on the State of Georgia was hosted as an exhibit around the United States in 1950, including Nashville, Detroit, Chicago, and Washington D.C. Her work was used to garner legislative change when "The American Parents Committee" showed her photographs to members of Congress.

From the mid-1960s to the 1970s, Palfi taught photography in Los Angeles. Institutions where she worked included the California Institute of the Arts, the Woman's Building, UCLA Extension, and the Inner City Cultural Center. Palfi was awarded a Guggenheim Fellowship in 1967 and a National Endowment for the Arts fellowship in 1974.

== Photography ==
Marion Palfi's work centered around equity, opportunity, and justice for all people. In her photo book There is No More Time: An American Tragedy, Palfi documented racism and segregation in Irwinton, GA, the site of the murder of Caleb Hill, the first reported lynching of 1949. Palfi's 1952 book Suffer Little Children focused on the living condition of disadvantaged children across the U.S., including the young inmates of the New York Training School for Girls. Palfi was a contributing photographer to Edward Steichen's landmark Family of Man exhibition in 1955. During her time traveling across the United States she was bothered by the amount of poverty and racial intolerance she was exposed. She also was confused by Americans lack to acknowledge of these problems within their communities. Palfi decided to use her camera as a way to document these problems and bring attention to them within the public eye. Using her new perspective on the topic of injustice and racial discrimination she was able to draw attention to these issues by documenting them with her camera.

Palfi's photography explored the concepts of social injustices in America. She created many photographic studies that focus on racial injustice against African Americans, poverty in cities, and racial discrimination against Native Americans. She originally had trouble getting her photographs displayed or show cased because many Americans refused to address these social justice issues within their own society.

== Activism ==
Palfi was the first photographer to arrive in Greenwood, Mississippi at the beginning of the town's civil rights protests in 1963. She photographed the Student Non-Violent Coordinating Committee offices after they were burned down, went to the residence of Dewy Green, and met with activists. As protests increased in violence, she was told to leave Greenwood. Following her time there, her photography was used by the US Department of Justice to support lawsuits against segregation in Greenwood and Leflore County.

Palfi attended March on Washington (August 28, 1963). She additionally chronicled, in photography, the opening of Prince Edward County schools in 1964, and the end of Massive Resistance. Palfi marched at Selma in 1965 with Martin Luther King Jr.

Marion describes herself as a "social change photographer" and she believed that art could and should effect social change. She used her camera as a tool to show the public the problems within their own society to an attempt to incite a movement of change.

== Legacy ==
Palfi taught photography at the Inner-City Cultural Center in LA, before dying from breast cancer in 1978. Palfi's husband, Martin Magner, donated much of her papers to the Center for Creative Photography at the University of Arizona in Tucson, Arizona.
