= Martin Magner =

German-American theatre, radio, and television director

Martin Magner (March 5, 1900 – January 30, 2002) was a German-American theatre, radio, and television director.

Magner was born in Stettin, Germany (now Szczecin, Poland); his father was a Lutheran director of a shipping line and his mother a Jewish concert pianist. He acted in the Hamburg Chamber Theatre from the age of 18 and replaced the general director of the company when he left for fear of the Nazis, despite his protest that he was himself Jewish. Four years later, on March 21, 1933, after being ordered to fire the company's remaining Jews, he fled to Vienna.

For the following three years he worked there, in Breslau (now Wrocław, Poland), and in Prague, where he directed operas. During these years he won praise from George Bernard Shaw, who liked his production of his play Too True to Be Good enough to call Magner an exception to his rule that "Youth is wasted on the young", and Sigmund Freud, who offered to train him as a lay psychoanalyst on the strength of a play about a psychiatrist. He declined.

In 1936 Magner emigrated to the United States, settling in Chicago, where a Prague friend, Kurt Herbert Adler, was doing theatre work. For a while he taught at Northwestern University and again directed opera. In the 1940s he moved to radio and then in 1943 to television, working as a producer and director for 25 years, first for NBC and then from 1950 to 1965 for CBS in New York. His work included pioneering shows like Studio One, The Goldbergs, Lamp Unto My Feet, and Robert Montgomery Presents, and he hired a young Studs Terkel.

After having to retire when he reached the age of 65, he moved to California and returned to theatre; he became the artistic director of the Inglewood Playhouse and started the New Theatre Inc. with Hope Summers. He made a practice of celebrating his birthday by directing a challenging play: for his 98th, Friedrich Dürrenmatt's Play Strindberg and for his 99th, the West Coast premiere of Thomas Hurlimann's The Envoy. He preferred classics; other examples were Georg Büchner's Woyzeck, Ben Jonson's Volpone, Jean Paul Sartre's The Condemned of Altona, Somerset Maugham's The Sacred Flame, and Athol Fugard's Blood Knot. He often used multi-racial casts.

The Los Angeles Drama Critics Circle gave him a special award in 1975 and a lifetime achievement award in 1989.

Magner enjoyed mountain climbing. He was married for the third time to the photographer Marion Palfi; she died of breast cancer in 1979. He died of cancer in Los Angeles.
