= New York Training School for Girls =

Former reformatory school in New York, US

Coordinates: 42.2439°N 73.7935°W

New York Training School for Girls in Hudson was a reformatory school, where teenage girls, between the ages of 12 and 16, who were convicted of any form of juvenile delinquency in New York state were sent. The institution operated between 1904 and 1975. Since 1976 it has been a minimum security prison for young male adults, recently called Hudson Correctional Facility. It is famous for the sociometric research done by Jacob Moreno and Helen Jennings in the 1930s.

== History ==
The reformatory was established in 1904 as the only institution in New York state which could provide training for delinquent girls under the age of 16. The institute took the place and the buildings of the former House of Refuge for Women. It was located on the east side of the Hudson River, with a "famous view" of the Catskill mountains. In the beginning there were seven, three-story, well-established cottages for 26 girls on average, several sports fields, office buildings and a chapel. A superintendent led the institution and each cottage had a teacher and a few officers. The teacher, or "house mother" played the part of the parents, and officials such as kitchen officials were responsible for leading the activity of the girls.

== Methods of reformation ==
=== Early years ===
The official aim of the institution was to develop healthy bodily and mental activities in order to make their inmates more likely to "do well after leaving the institution". The "reformation" was based on three pillars.

1. Physical culture: personalized calisthenics and gymnastics training
2. Education: four grades of elementary school, introduction to housework, like cooking, ironing, laundry, dressmaking and gardening.
3. Moral and religious introduction: "The moral instruction is enforced by practice and example rather than by precept". Corporal punishment was strictly prohibited.

=== The 1930s - Moreno and the sociometry ===
In 1932 there was a pandemic of runaways at the institution: within two weeks 14 girls ran away, 30 times more than the average number. At that time the reformatory consisted of 16 cottages. The supreme superintendent, Fannie French Morse had heard of Jacob Moreno's idea of mapping up societies with natural scientific methods and had also heard of his successes in Sing Sing prison. After the first meeting she hired Moreno to be the Research Director of the institute. Moreno and his assistant Helen Jennings examined 500 girls, their intelligence, social activities and most importantly, their feelings towards each other. Using the method of sociometry he visualized these connections in several sociograms. The earned experiences and the graphs were published in his seminal book Who shall survive?. As a conclusion he distilled that behind social phenomena there is an inexplicable driving force which is due to the structure of the relationships between individuals. It was true for the girls from Hudson: the runaway reactions were unconscious. Rather they behaved how their location in the social network forced them to.

== Notable people connected to the institute ==
- Ella Fitzgerald, world famous jazz singer, spent almost a year in the reformatory. According to the log book she arrived in April 1933 and she ran away at the end of 1933 or the beginning of 1934.
- Marion Palfi, photographer, visited the New York Training School for Girls in 1946, and photographed girls for her book (Suffer Little Children).
- Jacob Moreno, psychologist who conducted aforementioned studies.
