= Psychodrama =

Therapeutic method

- ICD-9-CM: 94.43
- MeSH: D011577

Psychodrama is an acting method, often used as a psychotherapy, in which clients use spontaneous dramatization, role playing, and dramatic self-presentation to investigate and gain insight into their lives. Developed by Jacob L. Moreno and his wife Zerka Toeman Moreno, psychodrama includes elements of theater, often conducted on a stage, or a space that serves as a stage area, where props can be used. A psychodrama therapy group, under the direction of a licensed psychodramatist, reenacts real-life, past situations (or inner mental processes), acting them out in present time. Participants then have the opportunity to evaluate their behavior, reflect on how the past incident is getting played out in the present and more deeply understand particular situations in their lives.

Psychodrama offers a creative way for an individual or group to explore and solve personal problems. It may be used in a variety of clinical and community-based settings in which other group members (audience) are invited to become therapeutic agents (stand-ins) to populate the scene of one client. Besides benefits to the designated client, "side-benefits" may accrue to other group members, as they make relevant connections and insights to their own lives from the psychodrama of another. A psychodrama is best conducted and produced by a person trained in the method, called a psychodrama director.

In a session of psychodrama, one client of the group becomes the protagonist, and focuses on a particular, personal, emotionally problematic situation to enact on stage. A variety of scenes may be enacted, depicting, for example, memories of specific happenings in the client's past, unfinished situations, inner dramas, fantasies, dreams, preparations for future risk-taking situations, or unrehearsed expressions of mental states in the here and now. These scenes either approximate real-life situations or are externalizations of inner mental processes. Other members of the group may become auxiliaries and support the protagonist by playing other significant roles in the scene, or they may step in as a "double" who plays the role of the protagonist.

A core tenet of psychodrama is Moreno's theory of "spontaneity-creativity". Moreno believed that the best way for an individual to respond creatively to a situation is through spontaneity, that is, through a readiness to improvise and respond in the moment. By encouraging an individual to address a problem in a creative way, reacting spontaneously and based on impulse, they may begin to discover new solutions to problems in their lives and learn new roles they can inhabit within it. Moreno's focus on spontaneous action within the psychodrama was developed in his Theatre of Spontaneity, which he directed in Vienna in the early 1920s. Disenchanted with the stagnancy he observed in conventional, scripted theatre, he found himself interested in the spontaneity required in improvisational work. He founded an improvisational troupe in the 1920s. This work in the theatre impacted the development of his psychodramatic theory.

== Methods ==
In psychodrama, participants explore internal conflicts by acting out their emotions and interpersonal interactions on stage. A psychodrama session (typically 90 minutes to 2 hours) focuses principally on a single participant, known as the protagonist. Protagonists examine their relationships by interacting with the other actors and the leader, known as the director. This is done using specific techniques, including mirroring, doubling, soliloquy, and role reversal. The session is often broken up into three phases: the warm-up, the action, and the post-discussion.

During a typical psychodrama session, a number of clients gather together. One of these clients is chosen by the group as the protagonist, and the director calls on the other clients to assist the protagonist's "performance," either by portraying other characters, or by utilizing mirroring, doubling, or role reversal. The clients act out a number of scenes in order to allow the protagonist to work through certain scenarios. This is obviously beneficial for the protagonist, but also is helpful to the other group members, allowing them to assume the role of another person and apply that experience to their own life. The focus during the session is on the acting out of different scenarios, rather than simply talking through them. All of the different elements of the session (stage, props, lighting, etc.) are used to heighten the reality of the scene.

The three sections of a typical session are the warm-up, the action, and the sharing. During the warm-up, the actors are encouraged to enter into a state of mind where they can be present in and aware of the current moment and are free to be creative. This is done through the use of different ice-breaker games and activities. Next, the action section of the psychodrama session is the time in which the actual scenes themselves take place. Finally, in the post-discussion, the different actors are able to comment on the action, coming from their personal point of view, not as a critique, sharing their empathy and experiences with the protagonist of the scene.

The following are core psychodramatic techniques:

- Mirroring: The protagonist is first asked to act out an experience. After this, the client steps out of the scene and watches as another actor steps into their role and portrays them in the scene.
- Doubling: The job of the double is to make conscious any thoughts or feelings that another person is unable to express whether it is because of shyness, guilt, inhibition, politeness, fear, anger, etc. In many cases, the person is unaware of these thoughts or at least is unable to form the words to express how they are feeling. Therefore, the Double attempts to make conscious and give form to the unconscious and/or under expressed material. The person being doubled has the full right to disown any of the Double's statements and to correct them as necessary. In this way, doubling itself can never be wrong.
- Role playing: The client portrays a person or object that is problematic to him or her.
- Soliloquy: The client speaks his or her thoughts aloud in order to build self-knowledge.
- Role reversal: The client is asked to portray another person while a second actor portrays the client in the particular scene. This not only prompts the client to think as the other person but also has some of the benefits of mirroring, as the client see themselves as portrayed by the second actor.

== Psychological applications ==
Psychodrama can be used in both non-clinical and clinical arenas. In the non-clinical field, psychodrama is used in business, education, and professional training. In the clinical field, psychodrama may be used to alleviate the effects of emotional trauma and PTSD. One specific application in clinical situations is for people suffering from dysfunctional attachments. For this reason, it is often utilized in the treatment of children who have suffered emotional trauma and abuse. Using role-play and story telling, children may be able to express themselves emotionally and reveal truths about their experience they are not able to openly discuss with their therapist, and rehearse new ways of behavior. Moreno's theory of child development offers further insight into psychodrama and children. Moreno suggested that child development is divided into four stages: finding personal identity (the double), recognizing oneself (the mirror stage), the auxiliary ego (finding the need to fit in), and recognizing the other person (the role-reversal stage). Mirroring, role-playing and other psychodramatic techniques are based on these stages. Moreno believed that psychodrama could be used to help individuals continue their emotional development through the use of these techniques.

== Related concepts ==
=== Sociometry ===
Moreno's term sociometry is often used in relation to psychodrama. By definition, sociometry is the study of social relations between individuals—interpersonal relationships. It is, more broadly, a set of ideas and practices that are focused on promoting spontaneity in human relations. Classically, sociometry involves techniques for identifying, organizing, and giving feedback on specific interpersonal preferences an individual has. For example, in a psychodrama session, allowing the group to decide whom the protagonist shall be employs sociometry.

Moreno is also credited for founding sociodrama. Though sociodrama, like psychodrama, utilizes the theatrical form as means of therapy, the terms are not synonymous. While psychodrama focuses on one patient within the group unit, sociodrama addresses the group as a whole. The goal is to explore social events, collective ideologies, and community patterns within a group in order to bring about positive change or transformation within the group dynamic. Moreno also believed that sociodrama could be used as a form of micro-sociology—that by examining the dynamic of a small group of individuals, patterns could be discovered that manifest themselves within the society as a whole, such as in Alcoholics Anonymous. Sociodrama can be divided into three main categories: crisis sociodrama, which deals with group responses after a catastrophic event, political sociodrama, which attempts to address stratification and inequality issues within a society, and diversity sociodrama, which considers conflicts based on prejudice, racism or stigmatization.

=== Drama therapy ===
The other creative arts therapies modality drama therapy, which was established and developed in the second half of the past century, shows multiple similarities in its approach to psychodrama, as to using theatre methods to achieve therapeutic goals. Both concepts however, describe different modalities. Drama therapy lets the patient explore fictional stories, such as fairytales, myths or improvised scenes, whereas psychodrama is focused on the patient's real-life experience to practice "new and more effective roles and behaviors" (ASGPP).

== History ==
Jacob L. Moreno (1889–1974) is the founder of psychodrama and sociometry, and one of the forerunners of the group psychotherapy movement. Around 1910, he developed the Theater of Spontaneity, which is based on the acting out of improvisational impulses. The focus of this exercise was not originally on the therapeutic effects of psychodrama; these were seen by Moreno to simply be positive side-effects.

A poem by Moreno reveals ideas central to the practice of psychodrama, and describes the purpose of mirroring:

A meeting of two: eye to eye, face to face.
And when you are near I will tear your eyes out
and place them instead of mine,
and you will tear my eyes out
and will place them instead of yours,
then I will look at me with mine.

In 1912, Moreno attended one of Sigmund Freud's lectures. In his autobiography, he recalled the experience: "As the students filed out, he singled me out from the crowd and asked me what I was doing. I responded, 'Well, Dr. Freud, I start where you leave off. You meet people in the artificial setting of your office. I meet them on the street and in their homes, in their natural surroundings. You analyze their dreams. I give them the courage to dream again. You analyze and tear them apart. I let them act out their conflicting roles and help them to put the parts back together again.'"

While a student at the University of Vienna in 1913–14, Moreno gathered a group of prostitutes as a way of discussing the social stigma and other problems they faced, starting what might be called the first "support group". From experiences like that, and as inspired by psychoanalysts such as Wilhelm Reich and Freud, Moreno began to develop psychodrama. After moving to the United States in 1925, Moreno introduced his work with psychodrama to American psychologists. He began this work with children, and then eventually moved on to large group psychodrama sessions that he held at Impromptu Group Theatre at Carnegie Hall. These sessions established Moreno's name, not only in psychological circles, but also among non-psychologists. Moreno continued to teach his method of psychodrama, leading sessions until his death in 1974.

From 1980, Hans-Werner Gessmann developed the Humanistic Psychodrama (HPD) at the Bergerhausen Psychotherapeutic Institute in Duisburg, Germany. It is based on the human image of humanistic psychology All rules and methods follow the axioms of humanistic psychology. The HPD sees itself as development-oriented psychotherapy and has completely moved away from the psychoanalytic catharsist theory. Self-awareness and self-actualization are essential aspects in the therapeutic process. Subjective experiences, feelings and thoughts and one's own experiences are the starting point for a change or reorientation in experience and behavior towards more self-acceptance and satisfaction. The examination of the biography of the individual is closely related to the sociometry of the group.

Another important practitioner in the field of psychodrama is Carl Hollander. Hollander was the 37th director certified by Moreno in psychodrama. He is known primarily for his creation of the Hollander Psychodrama Curve, which may be utilized as a way to understand how a psychodrama session is structured. Hollander uses the image of a curve to explain the three parts of a psychodrama session: the warm-up, the activity, and the integration. The warm-up exists to put patients into a place of spontaneity and creativity in order to be open in the act of psychodrama. The "activity" is the actual enactment of the psychodrama process. Finally, the "curve" moves to integration. It serves as closure and discussion of the session, and considers how the session can be brought into real life – a sort of debriefing.

Although psychodrama is not widely practiced, the work done by practitioners of psychodrama has opened the doors to research possibilities for other psychological concepts such as group therapy and expansion of the work of Sigmund Freud. The growing field of drama therapy utilizes psychodrama as one of its main elements. The methods of psychodrama are also used by group therapy organizations and also find a place in other types of therapy, such as post-divorce counseling for children.

== See also ==
- Diamond of opposites – Type of plot used in psychodrama groups
- Educational Psychodrama
- Gestalt therapy – Form of psychotherapy
- Play therapy – Children's mental health therapy method
- Playback Theatre – Form of improvisational theatre
- Sociodrama
- Sociometry – Quantitative method for measuring social relationships
- Theraplay

== General references ==
- Baim, C.; J. Burmeister, and M. Maciel, Psychodrama: Advances in Theory and Practice. Taylor and Frances: USA. ISBN 0-415-41914-X.
- Yablonsky, Lewis. Psychodrama: Resolving Emotional Problems Through Role-playing. New York: Gardner, 1981. ISBN 0-89876-016-X.
