= Salomon Abraham Rosanes =

Sephardic Jewish historian (1862–1938)

- Соломонъ А. Розанесъ
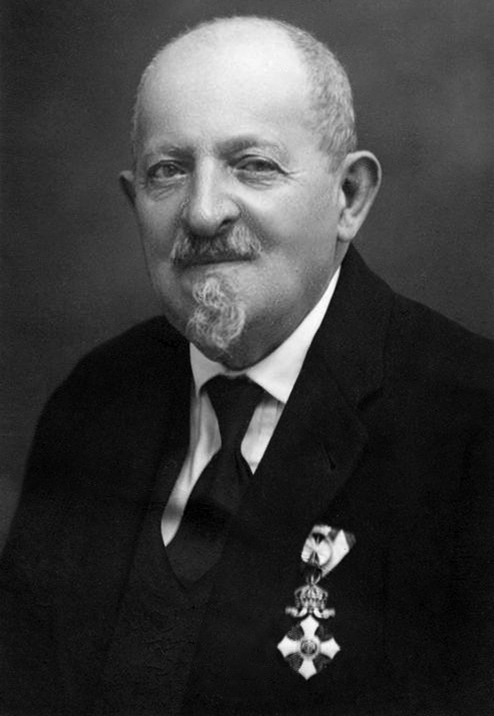
- Born: 14 April 1862; Rousse, Danube vilayet, Ottoman Empire
- Died: 12 May 1938 (aged 76); Sofia, Kingdom of Bulgaria
- Occupation: Historian
- Children: ≥1

Salomon Abraham Rosanes (also spelled Rozanis and Rozanes; Bulgarian: Соломонъ А. Розанесъ; 14 April 1862 – 12 May 1938) was a historian, archivist, and librarian of Sephardic Jewry and a researcher of the history of Jews in the Ottoman Empire.

== Early life ==
Rosanes was born in 1862 in Rousse, now in Bulgaria, in the Ottoman Empire to an Orthodox Jewish family of Sephardic origin. His family was one of around 200 present in the city at the time. His father, Avraham "Abbir" (1838–1879), was the head of the city's Jewish community, and was a rabbi, teacher, and educator. He was educated in Talmud Torah by Haim Bejarano. He followed that education by studying at the Alliance Israélite Universelle school, where he studied Turkish, German, and French.

In 1874, he came to Eretz Yisrael with his uncle, Mordechai Rosanes, a minister of the Ottoman Empire. While he was in Jerusalem, he learned Arabic. In 1877, when the Russo-Turkish War (1877–1878) broke out, he fled with his family to Serbia to escape violence. When he was 17, his father died and he had to go to work to support his family while he was still in school.

== Career ==
Rosanes wrote many articles in Bulgarian Jewish newspapers, and published several historical essays. At the turn of the 20th century, he moved to Constanța, in the Kingdom of Romania, where he joined Hovevei Zion and the Zionist movement, and was sent as one of the Bulgarian delegates to the Fourth Zionist Congress. In his adulthood, he also learned Greek, Italian, and Romanian and used his knowledge of thoses languages to gather information from many archives across the Ottoman Empire that he encountered during his travels. He settled in Galați County, Romania, although experienced financial difficulties and returned to Sofia, where he worked as a librarian at its Jewish Library until his death in 1938.

== Research ==
In his work, Rosanes claimed that Jews had settled in Bulgaria as early as the First Temple period, during the 6th century BC, contrary to many academics who believed that the Romaniote Jews were the first to arrive in Bulgaria, in the 1st century. According to him, the Book of Ezekiel hinted at the presence of Jews in the Balkans, and that Jews were aware of many countries to the north of them as part of trade expeditions, and that those included the Balkans.

He also helped to uncover documentation of the Marrano community, who had, for the most part, converted to the generic Sephardic rite once they immigrated to the Ottoman Empire in the 15th century, and had lost their original traditions. Using secondary sources and archaeological evidence that he studied, he was able to uncover much information that had thought to have been lost by the community.

He toured Bulgaria, and documented and collected fragments of tombstones, tablets, as well as inscriptions and manuscripts, some of which were lost following his record due to destruction during the wars of the 20th century. Testimonies collected by him are considered to be of great historical importance for locating the origins of Serphardi Bulgarian Jewry, as he had opportunities to interview close descendants of the original Sephardi settlers. He visited the archives of the Jewish community in Thessaloniki prior to the Great Fire of 1917, which destroyed the archives. His comprehensive description of many of the manuscripts he reviewed preserves many unique writings that were lost in the fire.

One of his unique traits as a researcher is that his writings were recorded almost entirely in the Hebrew language, among the first to even write history of Balkan Jews in Hebrew, which helped spread his teachings under the lingua franca. His writings not only covered history, but also linguistics, including his 1929 publication, One Language and One Thing, on Hebrew Philolphy. The book uses comparative linguistics to reconstruct origins of early written Hebrew. His research also asserted that the spoken language of Balkan Jews has roots in Ancient Greek, a remnant from the period of Roman rule. He noted that Cyril and Methodius borrowed letters from Hebrew when developing Cyrillic script, including the letters "Ш" and "Ц".

=== Criticism ===
Rosanes has been criticized by modern historians, as many have disagreed with his research methods on the basis of historical accuracy. They believe that since Rosanes did not have primary sources that could complete the historical picture, many conclusions he drew were inaccurate. However, none dispute that his extensive documentation that has preserved many facts and items that were lost and form the basis for much modern research. He often used inductive reasoning as the sole form of thought in his research, which have been criticized as erroneous.

Dr. Moritz Grünwald stated that in the ancient cemetery in the city of Vidin, Rosanes had found a tombstone with the inscription including the name Ananias (cognate to the name Hananya), which was also found on a tombstone that was identified in an ancient Roman Jewish cemetery. He used this to infer a connection that the tombstone at Vidin had to have belonged to a Jew, and used this as the basis for an earlier formation date of the Jewish community in Bulgaria, which Greenwald criticized as merely a hypothesis, with no backing information supporting it, and therefore is a weak claim.

== Legacy ==
There are streets named after him in German Colony, Jerusalem and Tel Baruch, Tel Aviv.

His family history, recorded by his brother Chaim, is extant and survives in its original manuscript in Tel Aviv.

His granddaughter, Laura Canetti, was married to Dr. Israel Calmi, a Bulgarian activist and attorney.

== Bibliography ==
- Rozanes, S. (1890-08-19). "On the question of the revival of the Hebrew language". HaMelitz. pp. 1–3.
- Rozanes, Shlomo Avraham (1914). איסטוריאה די לה קומונידאר ישראליתה די רוסג'וק [History of the Israeli Community of Rusjok] (in Hebrew). איסטאמפאריאה י. א. לוי.
- Rozanes, Shlomo Avraham (1928). שפה אחת ודברים אחדים: או, פילולוגיה עברית : עיון מחקר על ראשית הדבור בפי האדם [One Language and One Things: Or, Hebrew Philology: A Study of the Origin of Speech in the Tongue of Man] (in Hebrew). דפוס המשפט של אברהם אסא.
- Rozanes, Shlomo Avraham (1958). ימי ישראל בתוגרמה: על פי מקורים ישרים, 6 כרכים [The Chronicles of Israel in Translation: According to Authentic Sources, 6 volumes] (in Hebrew). Tel Aviv & Sofia: Dvir.

== Sources ==
- Kechales, Haim (1969). קורות יהודי בולגריה (in Hebrew). דבר.
