= Sociodrama =

Psycho-therapeutic method

A sociodrama is a dramatic play in which several individuals act out assigned roles for the purpose of studying and remedying problems in group or collective relationships. It was developed by social scientist Jacob L. Moreno to explore sociological interests using the techniques he originated in psychodrama for psychology. Sociodrama may be applied to collective trauma and current events, social problems and disintegration, prejudice, interpersonal tension and justice and rehabilitation.

== See also ==
- Psychodrama
- Role theory
- Social research
