= Jacob L. Moreno =

Romanian-American psychiatrist (1889–1974)

Jacob Moreno
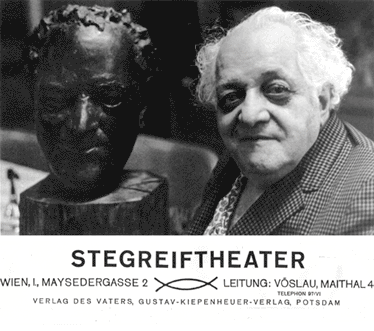
- Born: Iacob Levy; May 18, 1889; Bucharest, Kingdom of Romania
- Died: May 14, 1974 (aged 84); Beacon, New York, U.S.
- Education: University of Vienna
- Known for: Sociometry, psychodrama
- Spouses: Beatrice Beecher, Florence Bridge, Zerka T. Moreno
- Scientific career
- Fields: Psychiatry, psychology, psychotherapy, social psychology
- Workplaces: Teachers College, Columbia University; The New School

Jacob Levy Moreno (born Iacob Levy; May 18, 1889 – May 14, 1974) was a Romanian-American psychiatrist, psychosociologist, and educator, the founder of psychodrama, and the foremost pioneer of group psychotherapy. During his lifetime, he was recognized as one of the leading social scientists.

== Early life and education ==
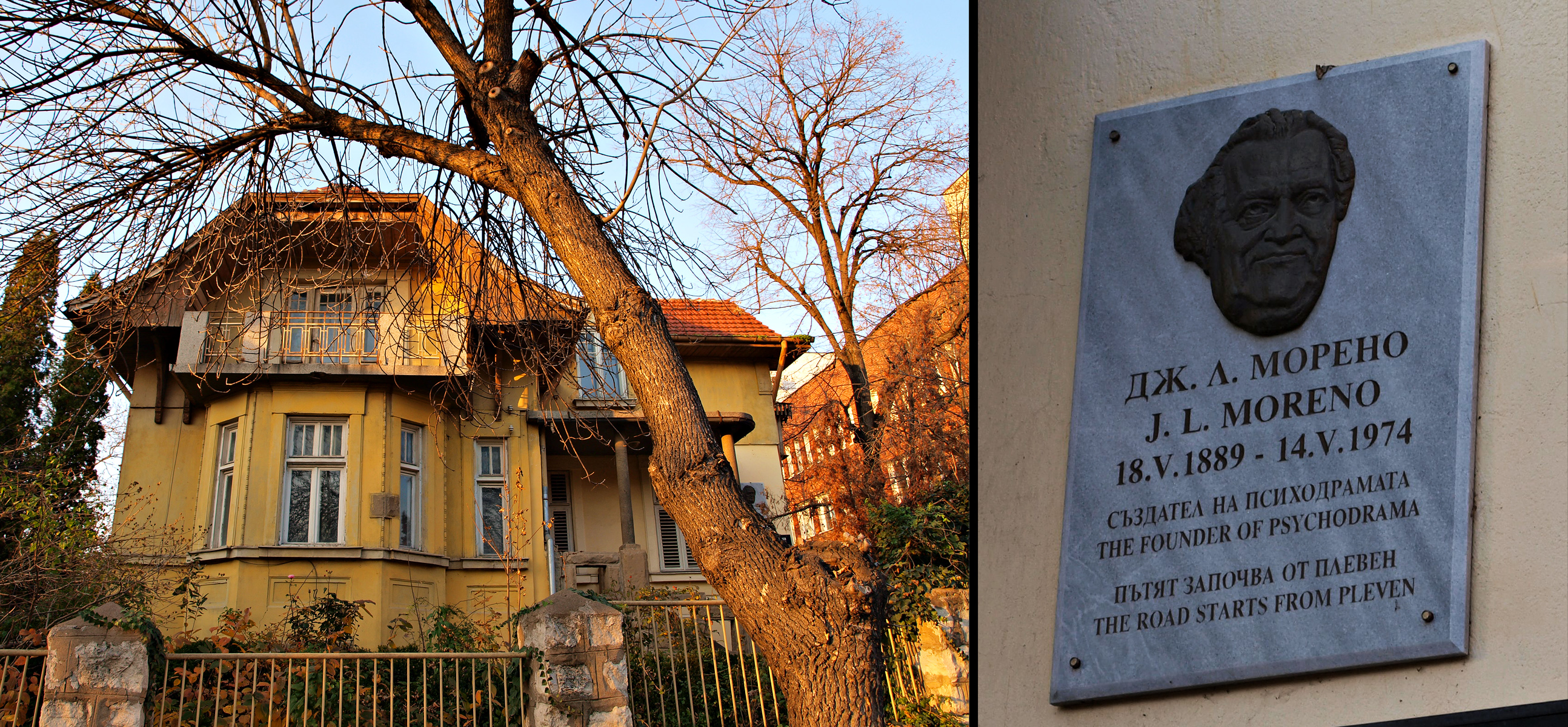
Moreno's ancestral home in Pleven, Bulgaria, and a close-up view of the commemorative plaque

Jacob Levy Moreno was born in Bucharest in the Kingdom of Romania. His father was Moreno Nissim Levy, a Sephardi Jewish merchant born in 1856 in Plevna in the Ottoman Empire (today Pleven, Bulgaria). Jacob's grandfather Buchis had moved to Plevna from Constantinople, where his ancestors had settled after they left Spain in 1492. It is thought that the Morenos left Plevna for Bucharest during the Russo-Turkish War of 1877–1878, following the Plevna rabbi Haim Bejarano in search of a more hospitable environment. Jacob Moreno's mother, Paulina Iancu or Wolf, was also a Sephardi Jew, born in 1873, and originated from Călărași, Romania.

In 1895, a time of great intellectual creativity and political turmoil, the family moved to Vienna. He studied medicine, mathematics, and philosophy at the University of Vienna, becoming a Doctor of Medicine in 1917.

He had rejected Freudian theory while still a medical student, and became interested in the potential of group settings for therapeutic practice. In his autobiography, Moreno wrote of encounter with Sigmund Freud in 1912. "I attended one of Freud's lectures. He had just finished an analysis of a telepathic dream. As the students filed out, he singled me out from the crowd and asked me what I was doing. I responded, 'Well, Dr. Freud, I start where you leave off. You meet people in the artificial setting of your office. I meet them on the street and in their homes, in their natural surroundings. You analyze their dreams. I give them the courage to dream again. You analyze and tear them apart. I let them act out their conflicting roles and help them to put the parts back together again.'"

== Marriages and children ==
In Brooklyn, New York, Moreno married Beatrice Beecher in 1926. The marriage ended in divorce, and in 1938 he married Florence Bridge, with whom he had one child, Regina Moreno (born 1939). They too were divorced, and he married Zerka Toeman in 1949, with whom he had one child Jonathan D. Moreno (born 1952).

== Career ==
While living in Vienna in the early 1900s Moreno started an improvisational theater company, Stegreiftheater, the Theater of Spontaneity where he formulated a form of psychotherapy he called psychodrama, which employed improvised dramatizations, role-plays and other therapeutic, spontaneous dramatic expressions that utilized and unleashed the spontaneity and creativity of the group and its individual members. Moreno saw "psychodrama as the next logical step beyond psychoanalysis." It was "an opportunity to get into action instead of just talking, to take the role of the important people in our lives to understand them better, to confront them imaginatively in the safety of the therapeutic theater, and most of all to become more creative and spontaneous human beings."

In his book Who Shall Survive? (Preludes, p.xxviii) Moreno wrote of the genesis of his Group Psychotherapy in 1913–14 in Vienna, formulating his ideas while working with groups of prostitutes.

Moving to the US in 1925, he began working in New York City. There, Moreno worked on his theory of interpersonal relations, and the development of his work in psychodrama, sociometry, group psychotherapy, sociodrama, and sociatry. In his autobiography he wrote "only in New York, the melting pot of the nations, the vast metropolis, with all its freedom from all preconceived notions, could I be free to pursue sociometric group research in the grand style I had envisioned".

The New York Times wrote "He found that acceptance of his theories was slow, particularly because some colleagues deplored his showmanship."

He worked at the Plymouth Institute, Brooklyn, and at Mount Sinai Hospital. In 1929, he founded an Impromptu Theater at Carnegie Hall and later did work at the Guild Theater. He made studies of sociometry at Sing Sing Prison in 1931.

In 1932, Moreno first introduced group psychotherapy to the American Psychiatric Association, and co-authored the monograph Group Method and Group Pschotherapy with Helen Hall Jennings. He and Jennings were the first to use a stochastic network model (or, "chance sociogram", as they called it), predating the Erdős–Rényi model and the network model of Anatol Rapoport.

In 1936 in Beacon, New York he founded the Beacon Hill Sanitarium, and the adjacent Therapeutic Theater.

In 1937–1938, he taught a university seminar on psychodrama ("Introduction to Psychodrama") at Columbia University under the auspices of the Guidance Laboratory, Teachers College. He later taught a seminar "On Sociometry" with and by invitation of Dr. Alvin Saunders Johnson at the New School for Social Research.

For the next 40 years he developed and introduced his Theory of Interpersonal Relations and tools for social sciences he called 'sociodrama', 'psychodrama', 'sociometry', and 'sociatry'. In his monograph entitled, "The Future of Man's World", he describes how he developed these sciences to counteract "the economic materialism of Marx, the psychological materialism of Freud, and the technological materialism" of our modern industrial age. In 1954, he was a founding member of the International Committee on Group Psychotherapy, which later transformed into the International Association of Group Psychotherapy.

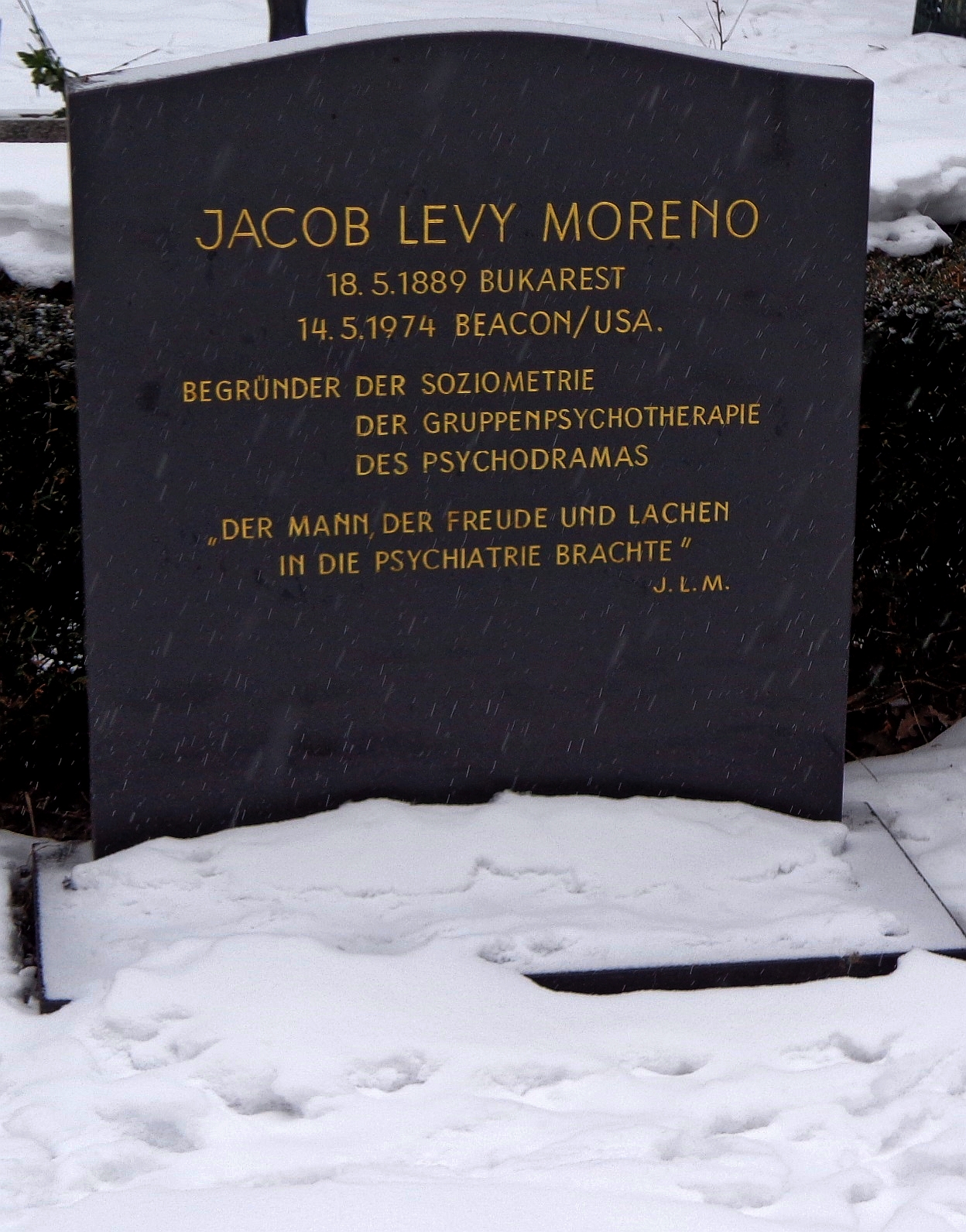
Feuerhalle Simmering, grave of Jacob Levy Moreno

His autobiography describes his position as "threefold:

1. Spontaneity and creativity are the propelling forces in human progress, beyond and independent of libido and socioeconomic motives [that] are frequently interwoven with spontaneity-creativity, but [this proposition] does deny that spontaneity and creativity are merely a function and derivative of libido or socioeconomic motives.
2. Love and mutual sharing are powerful, indispensable working principles in group life. Therefore, it is imperative that we have faith in our fellow man's intentions, a faith which transcends mere obedience arising from physical or legalistic coercion.
3. That a super dynamic community based on these principles can be brought to realization through new techniques..."

Moreno died at home in Beacon, N.Y., in 1974, aged 84. He chose to die by abstaining from all food and water after a long illness. His ashes are buried at Feuerhalle Simmering in Vienna. His epitaph, at his request, reads "DER MANN, DER FREUDE UND LACHEN IN DIE PSYCHIATRIE BRACHTE" (The man who brought joy and laughter to psychiatry).

== Summary of contributions ==
There is evidence that the methods of J. L. Moreno have held up respectably over time. Subsequent research from the University of Vienna shows the enormous influence that Moreno's theory of the encounter (Invitations to an Encounter, 1914) had on the development of Martin Buber's I-Thou philosophy, and Buber's influence on philosophy, theology, and psychology. His wife, Zerka Moreno, wrote: "While it is true that Buber broadened the idea of the Encounter, he did not create the instruments for it to occur." Moreno "produced the various instruments we now use for facilitating the human encounter, sociometry, group psychotherapy, psychodrama, and sociodrama". Zerka was herself an expert in psychodrama and sociometry, and continued her late husband's work.

Fritz Perls, the founder of Gestalt Therapy, acknowledged the influence of Moreno's work, including the emphasis on the "here and now", and the development of the "empty chair technique". Richard C. Schwartz, the founder of Internal Family Systems, acknowledged the direct influence of both Moreno and Perls' work.

Training centers and institutes associated with Moreno’s work operate on multiple continents. These institutions provide education and training in the Morenean arts and sciences across a range of disciplines, reflecting efforts to advance his theoretical and applied approaches within the social sciences.

Moreno is also widely credited as one of the founders of the discipline of social network analysis, the branch of sociology that deals with the quantitative evaluation of an individual's role in a group or community by analysis of the network of connections between them and others.

His 1934 book Who Shall Survive? contains some of the earliest graphical depictions of social networks (sociograms). In this book, he introduced a famous explanation, why a pandemic of runaways emerged at the New York Training School for Girls in Hudson.

Sociograms

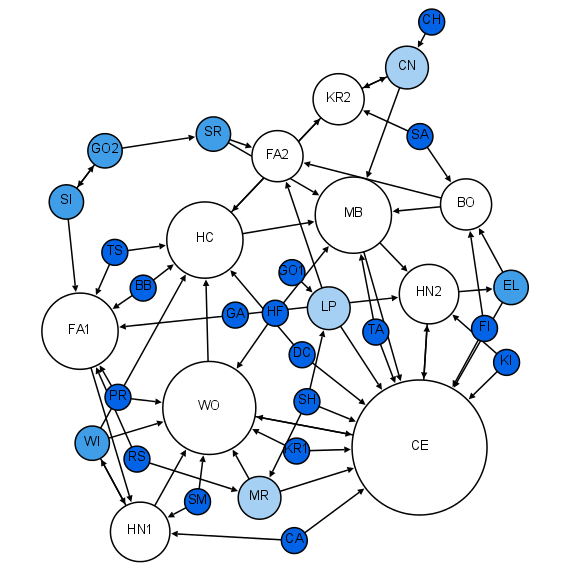
1st Grade

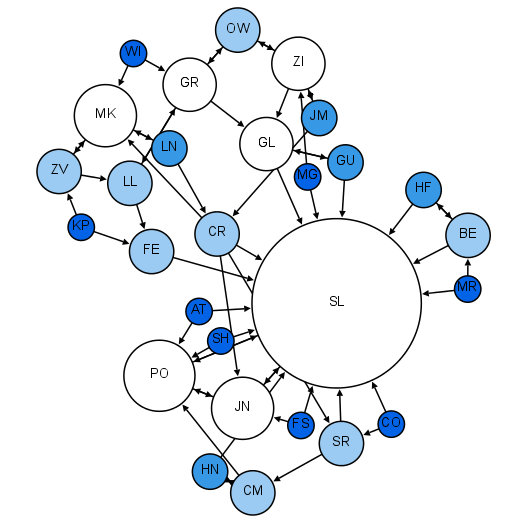
2nd Grade

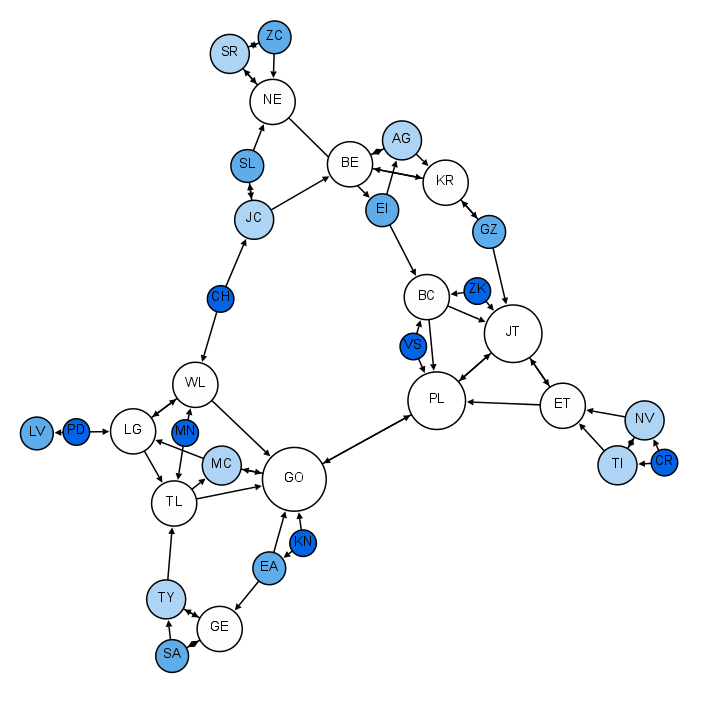
3rd Grade

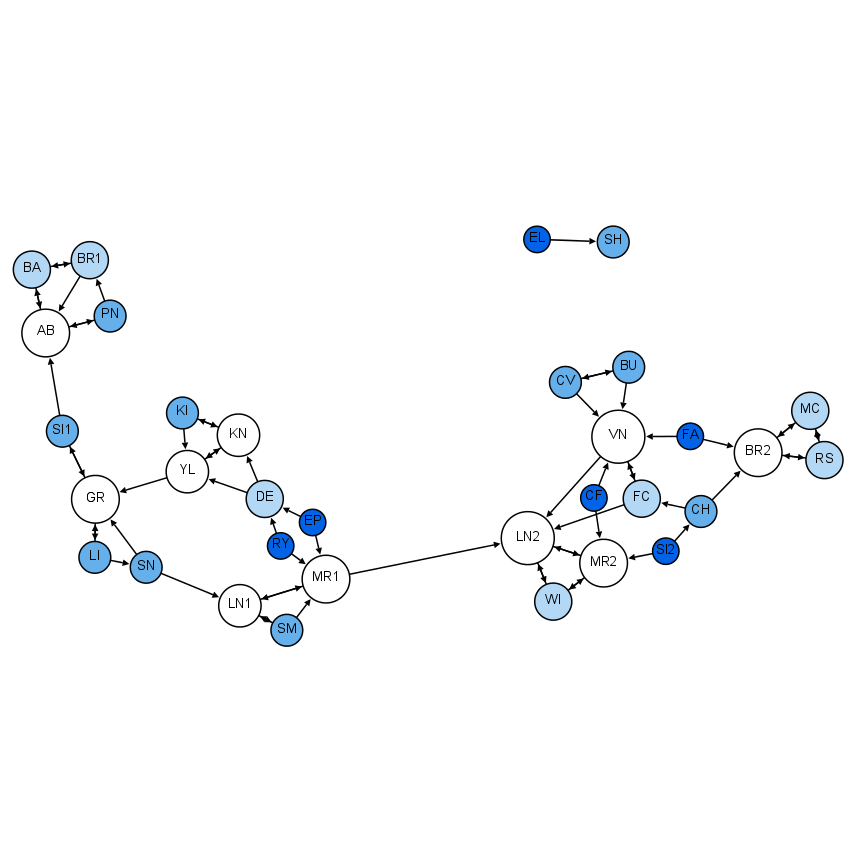
4th Grade

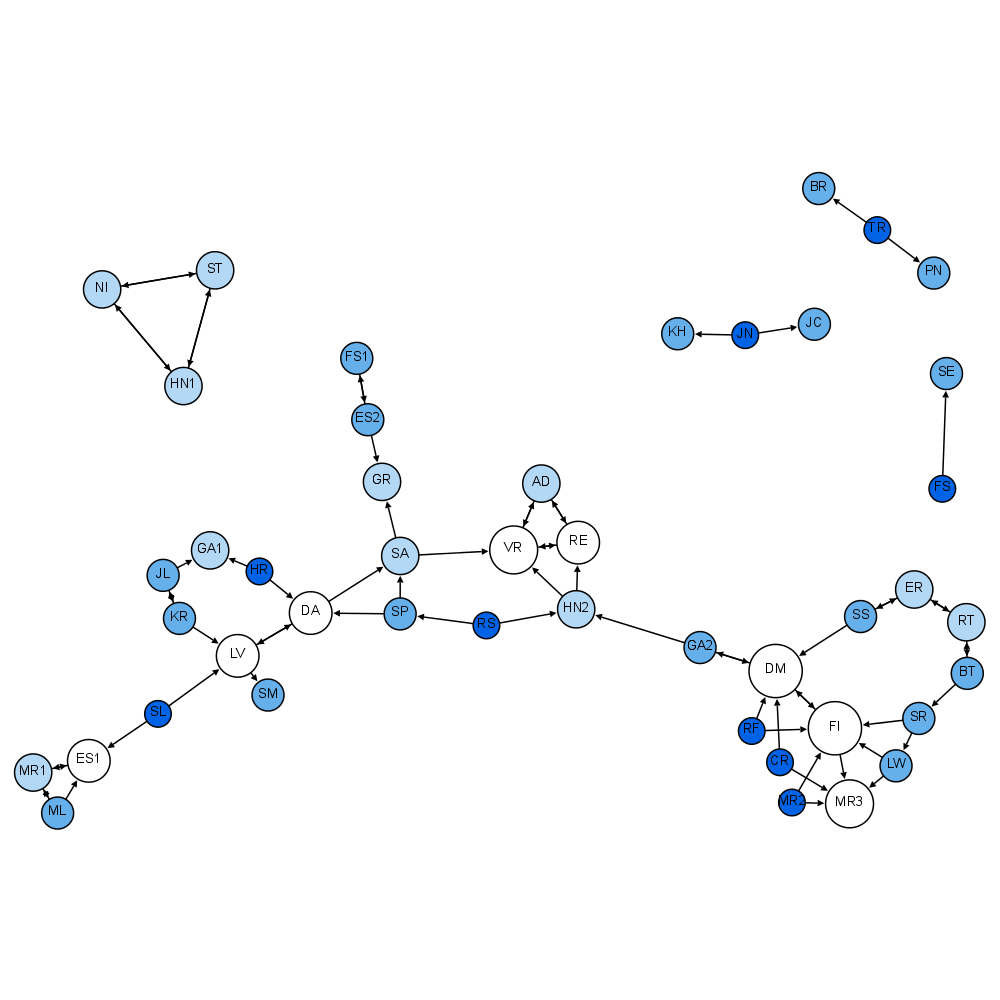
5th Grade

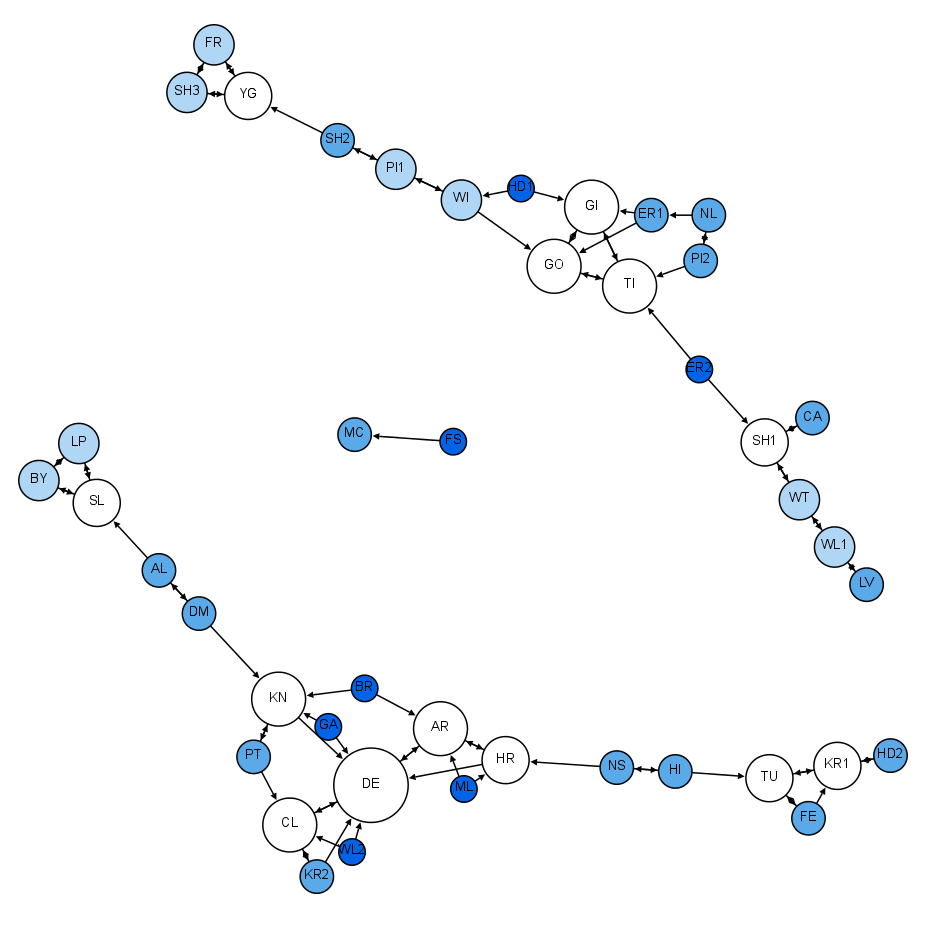
6th Grade

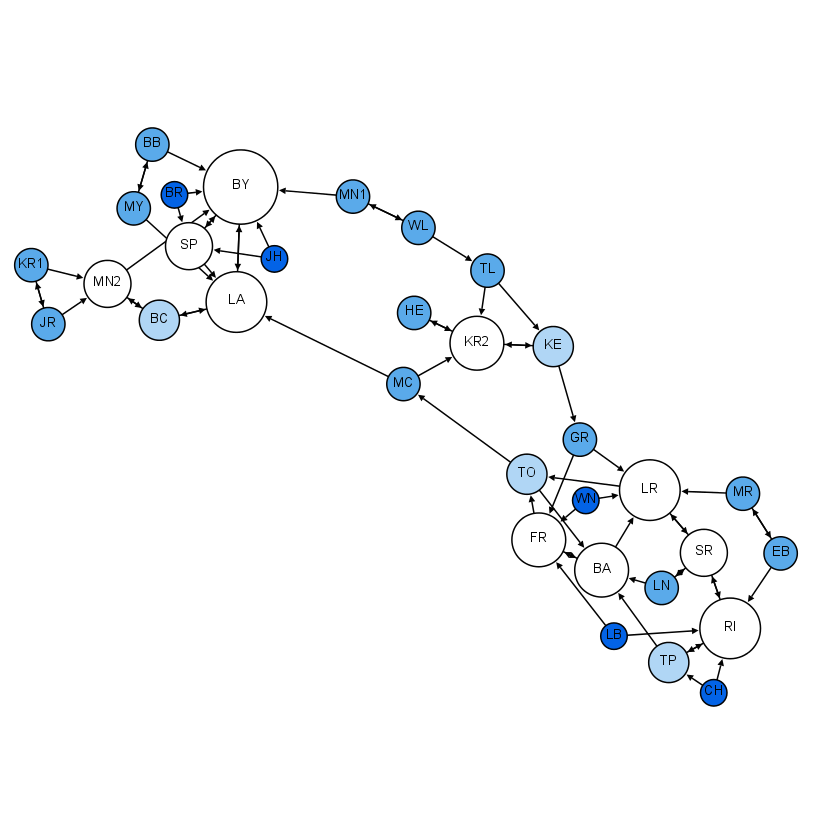
7th Grade

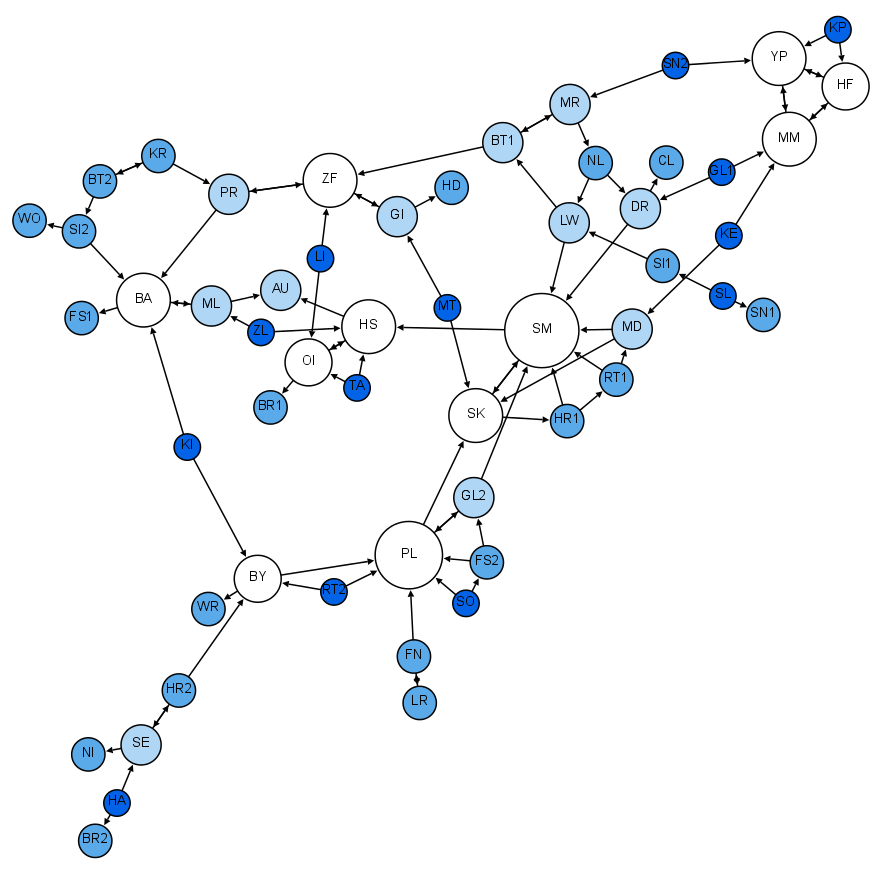
8th Grade

== Selected works ==
- Moreno, J. L. (1932). First Book on Group Therapy. Beacon House.
- Moreno, J. L. (1934). Who Shall Survive? A new Approach to the Problem of Human Interrelations. Beacon House. ISBN 978-9992695722
- Moreno, J. L. (1941). The Words of the Father. Beacon House. ISBN 978-1446601853
- Moreno, J. L. (1946). Psychodrama Volume 1. Beacon House.
- Moreno, J. L. (1947). The Theatre of Spontaneity Beacon House. ISBN 978-1445777139
- Moreno, J. L. (1951). Sociometry, Experimental Method and the Science of Society: An Approach to a New Political Orientation. Beacon House. ISBN 978-1291121759
- Moreno, J. L. (1953). Who Shall Survive? Foundations of Sociometry, Group Psychotherapy and Sociodrama. Beacon House.
- Moreno, J. L. (1956). Sociometry and the Science of Man. Beacon House.
- Moreno, J. L. (1959). Psychodrama Volume 2: Foundations of Psychodrama. Beacon House.
- Moreno, J. L. (1960). The Sociometry Reader. Beacon House.
- Moreno, J. L., Moreno, Z. T., Moreno, J. D. (1964). The First Psychodramatic Family. Beacon House.
- Moreno, J. L. (1966). The International Handbook of Group Psychotherapy. Philosophical Library.
- Moreno, J. L. (1969). Psychodrama Volume 3: Action Therapy and Principles of Practice. Beacon House.
- Moreno, J. L. (1989). Preludes of my Autobiography. Beacon House.
