= Jay Schulkin =

American neuroscientist, philosopher, and public health researcher

- Born: December 29, 1952; Manhattan, New York
- Died: March 17, 2023 (aged 70)
- Citizenship: American
- Education: Purchase College (BA); University of Pennsylvania (PhD)
- Known for: Research on allostasis, sodium hunger, and American pragmatism
- Spouse: April Oliver
- Scientific career
- Fields: Behavioral neuroscience, Philosophy, Public policy
- Workplaces: Georgetown University, University of Washington, American College of Obstetricians and Gynecologists
- Doctoral advisor: Eliot Stellar

Jay Schulkin (December 29, 1952 – March 17, 2023) was an American behavioral neuroscientist, philosopher, and public policy researcher. He was a prolific author, producing approximately 40 books and over 500 peer-reviewed journal articles during a career that spanned neuroscience, clinical medicine, and pragmatist philosophy.

Schulkin held research professorships at Georgetown University and the University of Washington. He was also a long-time Director of Research for the American College of Obstetricians and Gynecologists (ACOG). Shortly before his death, he was appointed a Visiting Fellow at Gonville and Caius College, Cambridge.

== Early life and education ==
Schulkin was born in Manhattan and raised in the Bronx along with his older brother, Sandy. His father, Stanley, was a city bus driver and his mother, Rosalind, a hospital administrator. He enjoyed music and played the clarinet by ear.

His early life was marked by a non-traditional educational path; he left high school in the 10th grade and spent time in the Renaissance drug rehabilitation program following an arrest at age 16. After the death of a close friend from a drug overdose, Schulkin pursued his high school equivalency while working as a groundskeeper and bus driver at Sarah Lawrence College and entered SUNY Purchase.

At Purchase (1973–1977), he studied under neuroscientist George Wolf and philosopher Robert Neville, earning a BA in Philosophy. He subsequently attended the University of Pennsylvania, completing graduate work in philosophy (1978–1980) before earning a PhD in Behavioral Neuroscience from the School of Medicine in 1983 under the mentorship of Eliot Stellar., specializing in the neural mechanisms of sodium appetite. He subsequently completed postdoctoral training at Rockefeller University under the mentorship of Bruce McEwan.

== Career and research ==
=== Neuroscience and allostasis ===
Schulkin's primary scientific contributions were in the study of allostasis, a model of physiological regulation through change. Working with Bruce McEwen and Peter Sterling, he explored how the brain anticipates needs and how the cumulative "allostatic load" impacts health. He was also a leading expert on "sodium hunger," researching the neural mechanisms that drive the pursuit of salt. A notable work was The Brain in Context: A Pragmatic Guide to Neuroscience, co-authored by Jonathan Moreno.

=== Women's health and policy ===
From 1995 to 2017, Schulkin served as the Director of Research at ACOG. In this role, he linked behavioral neuroscience with clinical obstetrics, researching the effects of prenatal stress and fetal programming. He collaborated extensively with Michael L. Power on the evolution of human pregnancy and the biological origins of obesity.

=== Information science and collaboration ===
Throughout his career, Schulkin collaborated on the intersection of information science and public policy, most notably in the book Missed Information (MIT Press, 2016) which argued that transparency and the free flow of information are essential for environmental sustainability and social justice.

=== Philosophy ===
A dedicated proponent of American pragmatism, Schulkin sought to integrate the works of John Dewey and William James with modern cognitive science. His final book, Mind in Nature (2023), co-authored with Mark Johnson, was published shortly before his death.

=== Arts ===
Creative expression was central to his interests. He wrote widely on the connections between neuroscience and dance and music, in works like Reflections of a Musical Mind.

== Personal life ==
Jay Schulkin married April Oliver in 1990 at Princeton University. He was known for his prodigious energy and his habit of walking several miles daily between his home and laboratory. He died on March 17, 2023, at the age of 70, survived by his wife and two children, Danielle and Nick, and his brother Sandy.

== Selected bibliography ==
=== Books ===
- Sodium Hunger: The Search for a Salty Taste (1991)
- Allostasis, Homeostasis, and the Costs of Physiological Adaptation (2004)
- Curt Richter: A Life in the Laboratory (2005)
- The Evolution of Obesity (with Michael L. Power, 2010)
- Reflections on the Musical Mind: An Evolutionary Perspective (2013)
- Milk: The Biology of Lactation (with Michael L. Power, 2016)
- Missed Information: Better Information for Building a Wealthier, More Sustainable Future (2016), MIT Press.
- Oliver Wendell Holmes Jr., Pragmatism and Neuroscience (2017)
- Sport: A Biological, Philosophical, and Cultural Perspective (2019)
- Mind Ecologies: Body, Brain, and World (with Matthew Crippen, 2020)
- Mind in Nature: John Dewey, Cognitive Science, and a Naturalistic Philosophy for Living (2023), with Mark Johnson. MIT Press.

=== Representative papers ===
- Schulkin, J., Gold, P.W., & McEwan, B.S. (1998). "Induction of corticotropin-releasing hormone gene expression by glucocorticoids." Molecular Psychiatry.
- Sterling, P., & Schulkin, J. (2019). "Allostasis: A Brain-Centered, Predictive Mode of Physiological Regulation." Trends in Neurosciences.
- Schulkin, J. and Fluharty, S.J. (1993) Neuroendocrinology of sodium hunger: angiotensin, corticosteroids and atrial natriuretic hormone. In: Hormonally-Induced Changes In Mind and Brain (ed. J. Schulkin). San Diego: Academic press.
