= Israel Calmi =

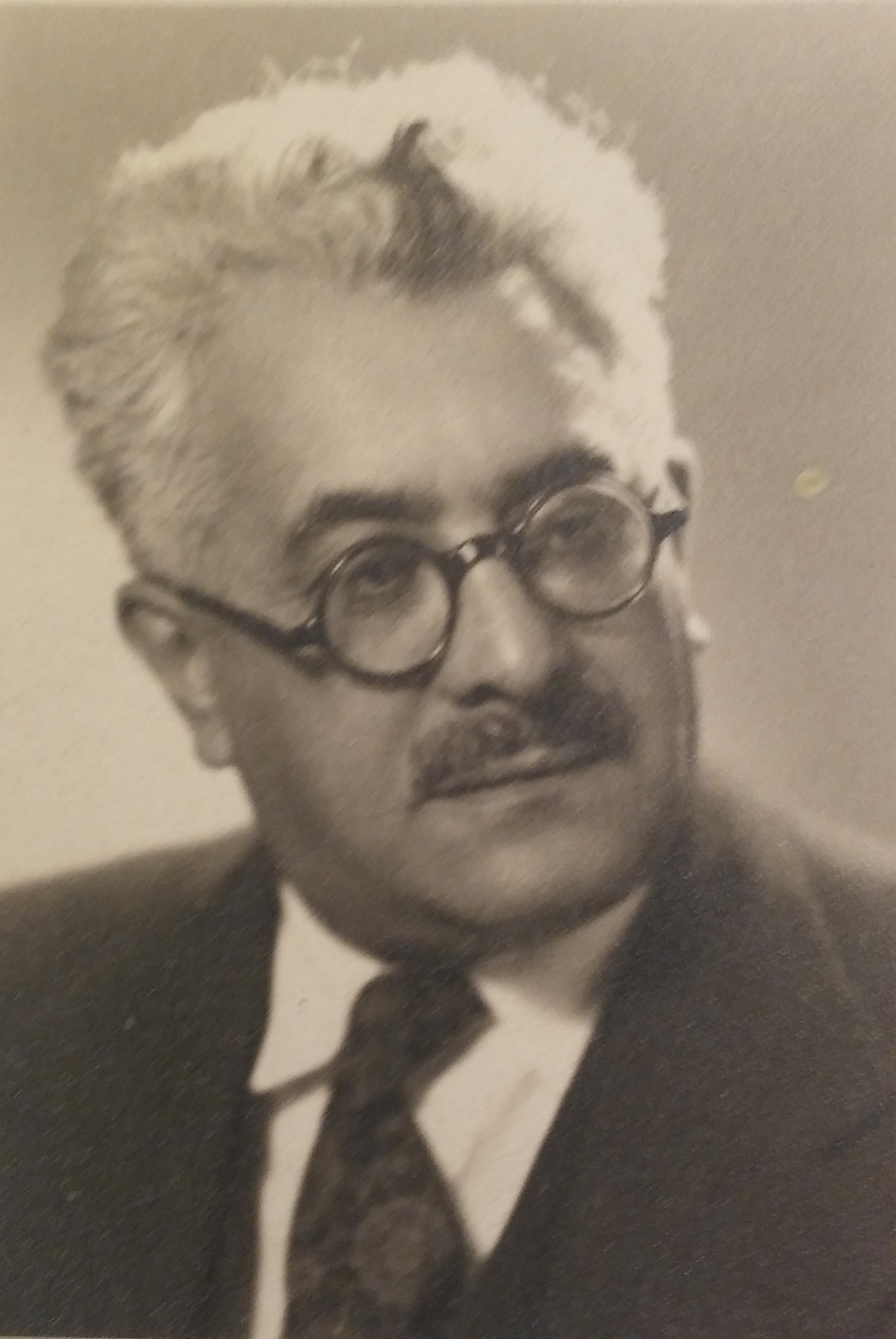
Dr. Israel Calmi

Doctor Israel Moshe Calmi (in Bulgarian: Исраел Калми; 1885 in Ruse, Principality of Bulgaria – 1966 in Sofia, the People’s Republic of Bulgaria) was an attorney in the city of his birth and afterwards in Sofia. Later, he was a member of the Jewish Consistory of Bulgaria. He took an active role in the struggle for the restoration of the rights of the Jews after the Second World War.

== Biography ==
Israel Moshe Calmi was born in Ruse, Bulgaria. He acquired his high school education at the Hristo Botev School in the city of his birth. He then went on through a scholarship from the Rothschild family to study law at the Faculty of Law in Berlin, Germany, where he completed his studies with a Ph.D. in law from Heidelberg University.

== Between the World Wars ==
Calmi worked as a commercial attorney. He took part in the public activity; he was a member of the Jewish Court of Family Law and a member of the philanthropic Association "Malbish Arumim" (Clothing the Needy).

== The Second World War ==
Starting in the mid-1930s, the Bulgarian government began to undertake activities to get closer to Germany, with the aim of thereby regaining those parts of Bulgaria lost to it following its defeat in the First World War. As part of its conciliatory measures toward Nazi Germany, legislation was passed on 23 January 1941. Known as the Law for the Protection of the Nation, this legislation significantly restricted the rights of Jews. In 1943, as part of its anti-Jewish activity, the government moved to the deportation of Jews from the territories of Bulgaria to the extermination camps in Poland. In February 1943 an agreement was signed between Bulgaria and Germany, under which the Jews of Trakia and Macedonia (“the liberated territories”) would be deported to Poland. At the same time that the transfer of Jews to temporary camps began, Calmi and others acted to reduce the number of Jews who were transferred to the camps.

In May 1943, Sofia Jews were exiled to provincial towns in order to facilitate their collection by trains and their dispatch to the extermination camps. Calmi and his family were exiled to the town of Cherven Bryag. The attempt to deport Jews to Poland from Bulgaria itself was thwarted thanks to the struggle conducted by the leaders of Bulgaria’s Jewish community with the support of Dimitar Peshev, the Vice President of the Sobranie – Bulgaria’s Parliament, Metropolitan (Bishop) Stefan, the Head of the Sofian Church, and Metropolitan Cyril, the Head of the Bulgarian Church in Plovdiv, as well as thanks to the opposition of Bulgarian public figures, writers, the Association of Lawyers, the Medical Association, and citizens from across the political spectrum.

On 31 May 1944, a new government was established, under the leadership of Ivanov Bagryanov, who was considered to hold pro-Western views. In a meeting between Bagryanov and Jewish public figures, the Consistory was brought back to life, headed by Colonel Avraham Tadjer. Calmi was appointed a member of the Consistory.

Bagryanov met with members of the Consistory. It was proposed to prepare a proposal for a law under which the rights of Jews would gradually be reinstated. Bagryanov announced his intention to act to annul the Law for the Protection of the Nation and its provisions. For this purpose, Bagryanov sought assistance by a legal expert of stature and accepted Colonel Tadjer’s recommendation to be assisted by Calmi, who Bagryanov knew to be a skilled and talented jurist /

On 20 June 1944, Calmi sent Bagryanov a well-structured, reasoned letter, via the Red Cross, in which he noted a number of restrictions that should be revoked immediately and various requests: removal of the requirement to wear the Yellow badge, allowing freedom of movement, the right to visit Sofia, the capital city, the reinstatement of the right to work, opening of the Jewish schools, synagogues and rabbinical courts, the granting of allowances for food and clothing, government support of public kitchens, liberation from the work camps, cancellation of the curfew hours, cancellation of the order forbidding Jews to enter shelters, and the restoration of the right of residence, anywhere. Following on from the letter, the two met two or three days after 20 July 1944. At the meeting Calmi was asked to travel to various cities in Bulgaria where there were Jewish communities and to present the intention of Bagryanov to annul the Law for the Protection of the Nation and comply with the demands to restore civil rights to Jews, as had been presented by Calmi.

The local Jewish committees in Pleven, Shumen, Razgrad, Lukovit, Provadia and Targovishte, organized public meetings, where Calmi lectured. In Russe, the local committee did not approve a meeting with him on the ground that he had not filed a preliminary summary of the matters he was about to address.

On 5 September 1944, the Law for the Protection of the Nation was annulled. On 9 September 1944 the Soviet Army entered Sofia, and pro-Communist forces seized power. A government formed by the Fatherland Front, a resistance movement that fought against the pro-German government, set up a People’s Tribunal. Bagryanov was accused of crimes against the Bulgarian nation, was tried and executed. Calmi testified at the trial.

== Family ==
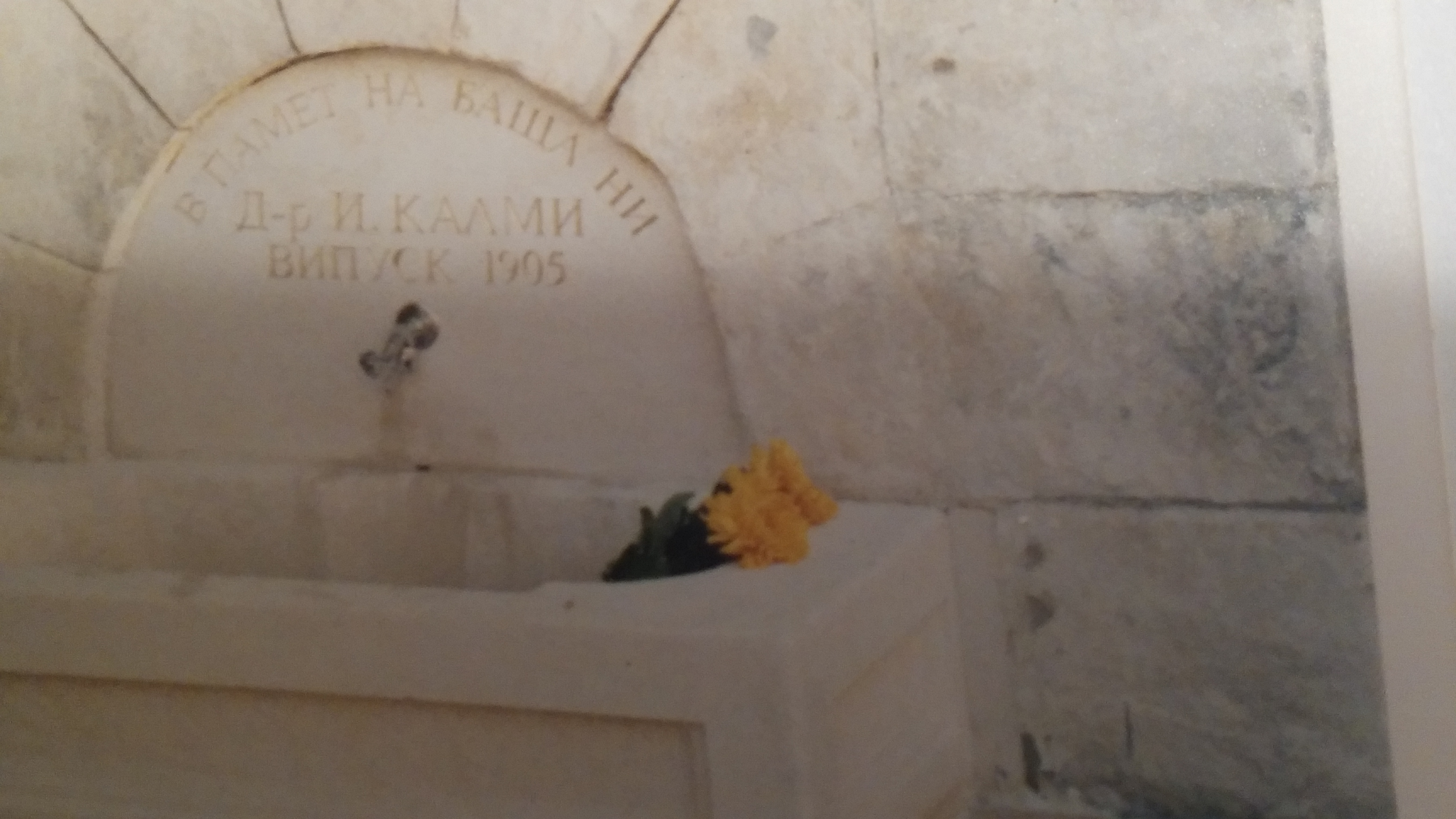
Water taps erected in memory of Dr. Israel Calmy, Christo Botev High School, Brostz'ok

Calmi was married to Laura née Canetti, the granddaughter of Solomon Avraham Rozanis, and a cousin of the author Elias Canetti, Winner of the Nobel Prize in Literature. The couple had two children: a son, Moshe, and a daughter, Rachel (Cordova). In 2004, his daughter established in her father’s memory two drinking fountains at the Hristo Botev Secondary School in Russe, the city of his birth.
