= Zerka T. Moreno =

Dutch-American psychotherapist (1917 – 2016)

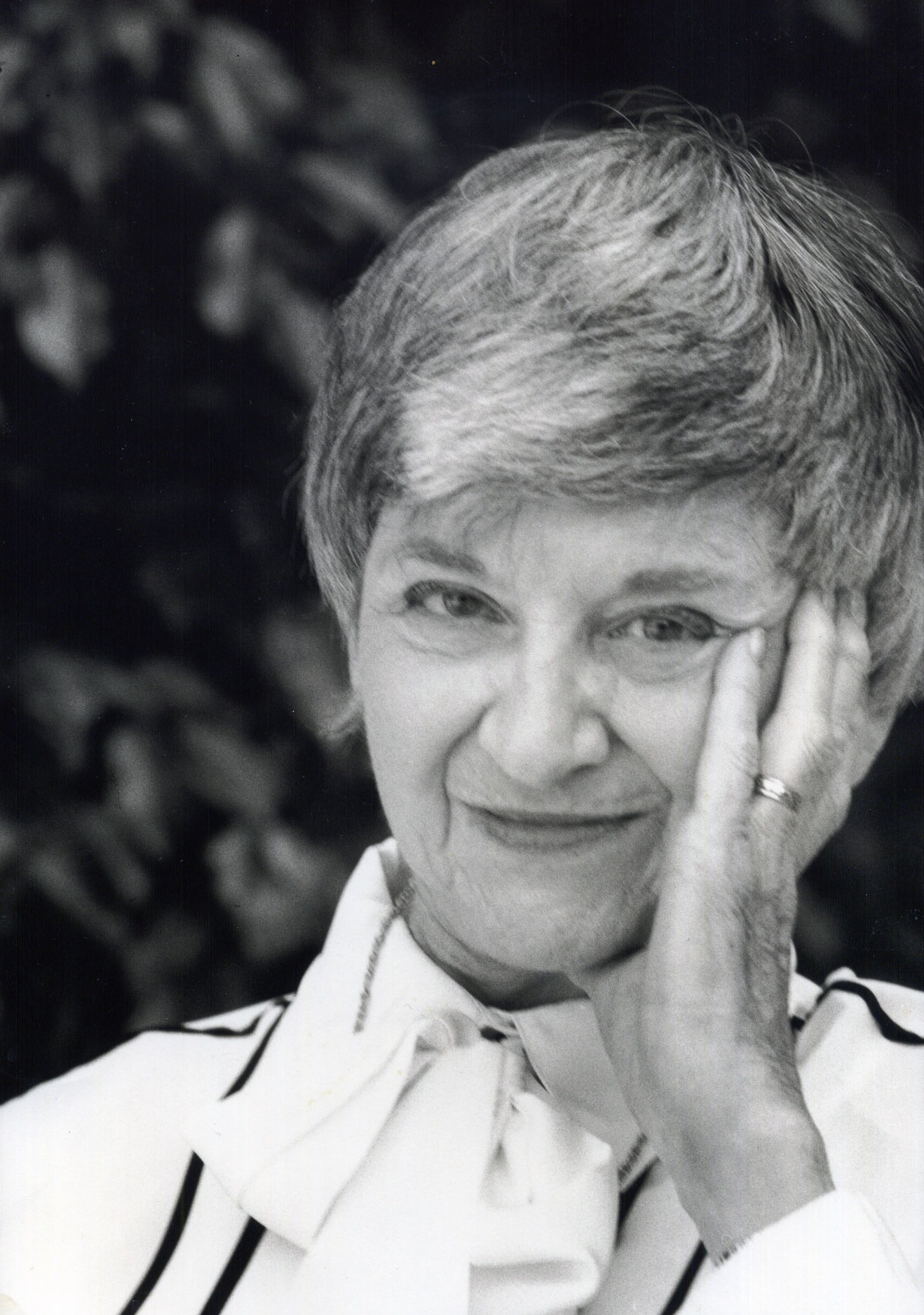
- Moreno in 1986
- Born: Celine Zerka Toeman; June 13, 1917; Amsterdam, Netherlands
- Died: September 19, 2016 (aged 99); Rockville, Maryland, U.S.
- Known for: Sociometry, psychodrama
- Spouse: Jacob Levy Moreno
- Children: Jonathan D. Moreno; Regina Moreno
- Scientific career
- Fields: Education, psychiatry, psychology, psychotherapy, social psychology

Zerka Toeman Moreno (June 13, 1917 – September 19, 2016) was a Dutch-born American psychotherapist and co-creator of psychodrama. She was a close colleague and wife of Jacob Levy Moreno.

== History ==
Celine Zerka Toeman was born in Amsterdam on June 13, 1917. Her paternal grandparents were grain merchants who, like many other Jewish families of the time, left Warsaw to go to England when Zerka's father, Joseph Toeman (1887–1956), was still a toddler. Her mother, Rosalia Gutwirth (1890–1969) originated from Eastern Europe.

It was in the Netherlands that Zerka, the youngest of four children, lived the first part of her life. Her siblings were Sabine (born 1912), Rudolph (1913–1992) and Charles (1916–1990). In 1931, when Zerka was fourteen, her parents moved to London to reunite with the rest of her father's family. Here, she finished high school and later studied art and fashion design. In 1939, she crossed the Atlantic for the first time to arrive in the USA with some family friends. In 1941, she was able to take her elder sister from Belgium to New York, to pursue treatment for her sister's mental illness.

Moreno was one of the co-founders of the International Association for Group Psychotherapy.

Moreno believed psychodrama could change the world, only if it listened and tried to understand. Her contribution to the field of group psychotherapy and psychodrama began immediately upon meeting Dr. J. L. Moreno. Within a year of their meeting, J.L. and Moreno founded the Sociometric Institute on Park Avenue, New York City. They established the Psychodramatic Institute in New York in 1942. They began producing the journal, Group Psychotherapy (originally called Sociatry) in 1947, publishing a volume of research documenting their application and refinement to the social sciences of sociatry, psychodrama, and sociometry. Moreno was J. L. Moreno's partner and co-creator for over thirty years until his death in 1974.

Moreno continued training and teaching the psychodramatic theory and method for more than 30 years since Dr. Moreno's death, training psychodramatists worldwide. Moreno is recognized as a leader in further realizing Dr. Moreno's vision in bringing this method to the lives of communities worldwide. In the 2000s, she lived in Charlottesville, Virginia.

Moreno died in Rockville, Maryland, on September 19, 2016, at the age of 99.

== The Zerka T. Moreno Foundation for Education and Training ==
The Zerka T. Moreno Foundation is a non-profit foundation that offers training, research and education programs based on the Morenean theory in Western Massachusetts, the Graduate School level at Lesley University in Cambridge, and in Portugal. The foundation also holds a resource library of unpublished documents by J.L. Moreno and a collection of training videos and lectures by Zerka T. Moreno.

== Bibliography ==
- Moreno, Z. T. (2012). To dream again: A memoir. New York: MHR
