= Helen Hall Jennings =

American psychologist (1905–1966)

- Born: September 20, 1905
- Died: October 4, 1966 (aged 61)
- Citizenship: American
- Education: New Jersey College for Women (Bachelor of Letters degree) 1927, Columbia University (degree)
- Occupation: Social psychologist
- Known for: Social network analysis
- Notable work: Developed quantitative research methods used to study sociometry

Helen Hall Jennings (September 20, 1905 – October 4, 1966) was an American social psychologist in the field of social networks in the early 20th century. She developed quantitative research methods used to study sociometry, a quantitative method for measuring social relationships. This work is cited as being the birth of social network analysis.

== Career ==
Jennings graduated from the New Jersey College for Women (now known as the Douglass Residential College at Rutgers University) in 1927 with a Bachelor of Letters degree.

Jennings pursued her graduate degree in psychology at Columbia University and specialized in empirical research design. While working in the lab of psychologist Gardner Murphy, she met Jacob L. Moreno. Through her knowledge of quantitative research methods and statistics, Jennings worked with Moreno to develop an empirical approach to social network research. Together they studied how "social relations affected psychological well-being” and “used quantitative methods for studying the structure of groups and the positions of individuals within groups."

Jennings and Moreno's research at Sing Sing and the New York Training School for Girls (also known as Hudson School for the Girls) "involved systematic data collection and analysis" and resulted in two published works: Application of the Group Method to Classification in 1932 and Who Shall Survive? A New Approach to the Problem of Human Interrelations in 1934. The approach of using quantitative data to study and measure relationships within groups of people resulted in the development of sociometry. Jennings and Moreno also became the first to use a stochastic network model (or, "chance sociogram", as they called it), predating the Erdős–Rényi model and the network model of Anatol Rapoport.

In 1931, Jennings received her Master of Arts degree from Columbia University. Her master's thesis was entitled "The nature of the pathetic." At that time she lived in Stelton, New Jersey. In 1943, Jennings completed her PhD thesis Leadership and Isolation: A Study of Personality in Interpersonal Relations, eventually published by Longman, Greens, and Company. Leadership and Isolation strove to examine how often-chosen leaders and isolates arise in a population. It was a continuation of analysis from the data collected at the New York Training School for Girls. Research participants were asked who they would like to work with and who they would like to live with. Eight months later, there was little change in the selected leaders and isolates.

Benjamin Karpman, a psychiatrist, describes the importance of Jennings's research in a review of the first edition of Leadership and Isolation for the Journal of Clinical Psychology. Karpman closes his review encouraging all psychiatrists to read Jennings’ book, stating, "it offers the most profound analysis of leadership and isolation in the social process this reviewer has discovered in the field of social psychology."

A second edition of Leadership and Isolation was published by Longman, Greens, and Company in 1950. Morris Janowitz, a founder of military sociology, reviewed the book for the American Journal of Sociology. In his review, Janowitz wrote that Leadership and Isolation "can be viewed as an ingenious empirical study which helped fashion sociometry as a research tool."

According to structural sociologist Linton C. Freeman, the empirical methods developed by Jennings and applied in Moreno's sociometry studies laid the groundwork for future social network research:

"Clearly, with a great deal of help from Jennings and Lazarsfeld, Moreno had developed an approach that included all of the defining properties of social network analysis. It was based on structural intuitions, it involved the collection of systematic empirical data, graphic imagery was an integral part of its tools and it embodied an explicit mathematical model. That structural perspective, moreover, was generalized to a range of phenomena. Thus, the group led by Moreno displayed all four of the features that define social network analysis."

Freeman draws the conclusion that Jennings was instrumental in the empirical research done in support of theories from Moreno:

"My own suspicion is that Jennings's contributions were immense. Moreno had no research training at all, and until this point, he had shown absolutely no interest in systematic research. All of his earlier publications were couched in heavy mysticism. But his newer works–those produced during his collaboration with Jennings–were comparatively systematic and were, for the first time, empirically grounded. The obvious conclusion is that, though the intuitive ideas came from Moreno, the completed research and the publications drew heavily on the contributions of Jennings. Jennings, it seems, was not only a collaborator but she was, in Moreno's terms, a very powerful 'muse.'"

== Selected works ==
- Moreno, Jacob L. and Jennings, Helen Hall. (1938). Statistics of social configurations. Sociometry, Vol. 1, pp. 342–374.
- Jennings, Helen Hall. (1947). Sociometry of Leadership: Based on the Differentiation of Psychegroup and Sociogroup. Beacon House. OCLC 3954870
- Jennings, Helen Hall. (1950). Leadership and Isolation: A Study of Personality in Interpersonal Relations. New York: Longman, Greens, and Company. OCLC 217786
- Jennings, Helen Hall. (1959). Sociometry in Group Relations: A Manual for Teachers. American Council on Education. OCLC 255156 ASIN B000WL0G9C
