= Eliot Stellar =

American physiological psychologist

Eliot Stellar (November 1, 1919 – October 12, 1993) was an American physiological psychologist who did research of the physiological processes of the brain and how they affect motivation and behavior. The National Academy of Sciences called him "one of the founders of ... behavioral neuroscience". Stellar was a provost at the University of Pennsylvania, a member of the National Academy of Sciences and the president of the Academy's the Human Rights Committee, president of the Eastern Psychological Association, president of the American Philosophical Society, a recipient of the Warren Medal of the Society of Experimental Physiologists and of the American Psychological Foundation's Gold Medal for Lifetime Achievement.

== Chronology ==
- November 1, 1919: born in Boston, Massachusetts
- 1941: graduated from Harvard University
- 1942: M.S., Brown University
- 1947: Ph.D., Brown University
- 1947-1960: faculty positions at Johns Hopkins University
- 1960-1965: professor of physiological psychology, Department of Anatomy, the University of Pennsylvania
- 1967: the Warren Medal of the Society of Experimental Physiologists
- 1965-1973: director of the Institute of Neurological Sciences, the University of Pennsylvania
- 1973-1978: provost, the University of Pennsylvania
- 1990, at age 70, Chair of the Department of Anatomy, University of Pennsylvania
- 1993: the American Psychological Foundation's Gold Medal for Lifetime Achievement
- 1993 dies of cancer at the University Medical Center in Philadelphia

== See also ==
- allostatic load
- Bruce McEwen
