= Ángel Pulido =

Spanish politician (1852-1932)

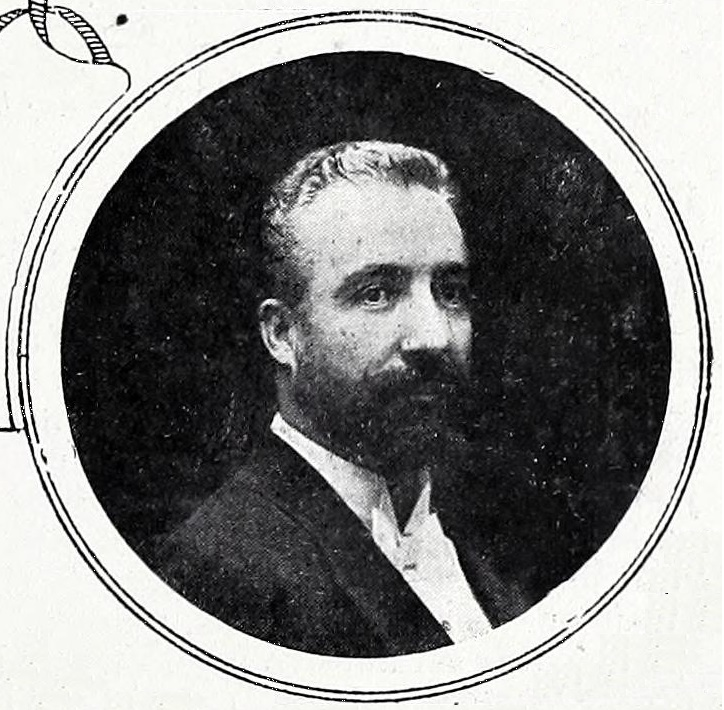

Ángel Pulido Fernández (1852–1932) was a Spanish physician, publicist and Liberal politician, who stood out as prominent philosephardite during the Restoration.

== Biography ==
Born on 2 February 1852 in the calle de las Infantas, Madrid, to a humble Catholic family of Asturian origin. He took studies in Medicine during the Sexenio Democrático (1868–1874).

He vowed to rebuild the links between and the Sephardi Jews, descendant of those expelled from the Iberian Peninsula in the late 15th century. He coined the expression españoles sin patria (Spaniards without a homeland) to refer to Sephardi Jews. His brand of Philosephardism, marked by a racialist approach, was not exempt, not unlike other philosephardists, from a certain degree of Islamophobia, and also stressed the superiority of Sephardi Jews over Ashkenazim. Aside from the pro-Sephardi cause, he also campaigned for humanization of the death penalty, for the professionalization of veterinarians, in favour of blind people and in favour of conscription.

He became a member of the National Royal Academy of Medicine. Elected Senator by the Academy of Medicine in 1899, and later in 1903 by the University of Salamanca, Pulido became a Senator for life in 1910.

He died on 4 December 1932.

== Bibliography ==
- Aragoneses, Alfons (2016). "Convivencia and filosefardismo in Spanish Nation-building". Research Paper Series (5). Max Planck Institute for European Legal History: 1–34.
- Díaz-Mas, Paloma (2000). "Repercusión de la campaña de Ángel Pulido en la opinión pública de su época: la respuesta sefardí" (PDF). España y la cultura hispánica en el sureste europeo.
- Ginio, Alisa Meyuhas (2008). "El encuentro del senador español Dr. Ángel Pulido Fernández con los judíos del Norte de Marruecos". El Prezente. Studies in Sephardic Culture: 111–126.
- Ginio, Alisa Meyuhas (2018). "The Sephardic Diaspora Revisited: Dr. Ángel Pulido Fernández (1852–1932)And His Campaign". Identities in an Era of Globalization and Multiculturalism. Vol. 8. Brill. pp. 287–296. doi:10.1163/ej.9789004154421.i-446.73. ISBN 9789004154421.
