= Social graph =

Graph representing social relations

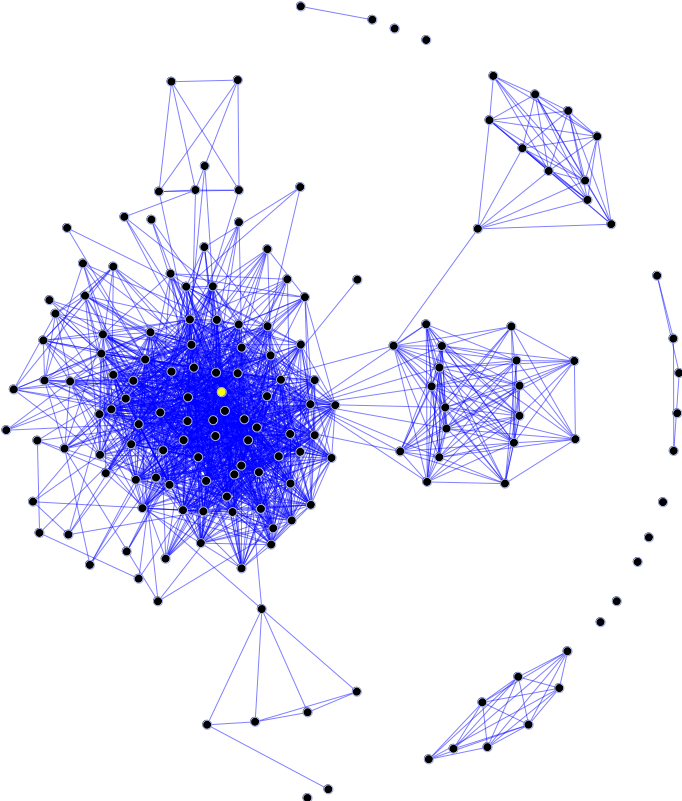
A drawing of a graph in which each person is represented by a dot called a node and the friendship relationship is represented by a line called an edge

This animation shows the different types of relations between social objects. User Eva is a friend of Adam and Kate, though Adam and Kate are not friends themselves. Peter's photo was "liked" by many users, including Eva. Also Eva listened to the Last.fm radio and watched the video from YouTube.

A social graph is a graph that represents social relations between entities. It is a model or representation of a social network. The social graph has been referred to as "the global mapping of everybody and how they're related".

The term was used as early as 1964, albeit in the context of isoglosses. Leo Apostel uses the term in the context here in 1978. The concept was originally called sociogram.

The term was popularized at the Facebook F8 conference on May 24, 2007, when it was used to explain how the newly introduced Facebook Platform would take advantage of the relationships between individuals to offer a richer online experience. The definition has been expanded to refer to a social graph of all Internet users.

Since explaining the concept of the social graph, Mark Zuckerberg, one of the founders of Facebook, has often touted Facebook's goal of offering the website's social graph to other websites so that a user's relationships can be put to use on websites outside Facebook's control.

== Facebook's social graph ==
As of 2010, Facebook's social graph is the largest social network dataset in the world, and it contains the largest number of defined relationships between the largest number of people among all websites because it is the most widely used social networking service in the world.

=== Impact ===
Facebook's social graph played a crucial role in the rapid growth of the company by increasing the engagement of its users, optimizing what each user sees in their feed and enabling an extremely efficient advertising policy. With their social graph, Facebook created a huge network of their platform's users which enabled them to grow exponentially.

One of the star features of Facebook is its feed – what each user sees in their app. Facebook's feed is mainly distributed using its Social Graph. Instead of displaying random publication from random users, the graph allows the app to display personalized content based on each user's previous interactions. This individualized approach enhances the experience that the app offers which increase users' engagement towards the social media application. Likes, shares and comments also play a key role in the social graph's layout, by reinforcing interactions and visibility between two users who enjoy the same classes of entertainment.

=== Analysis ===
Facebook's social graph has been analyzed by multiple papers. In 2011, a study confirmed the six degrees of separation phenomenon on the scale of the graph.

=== Data storing ===
Social graphs are typically stored using graph databases, which utilize graph query languages to manage and query relationships efficiently.

For the storing of its social graph, Facebook relies on TAO (The Associations and Objects), a custom-built, distributed system optimized for fast read operations at a massive scale.

=== Issues ===
Several issues have come forward regarding the existing implementation of the social graph owned by Facebook. For example, currently, a social networking service is unaware of the relationships forged between individuals on a different service. This creates an online experience that is not seamless, and instead provides for a fragmented experience due to the lack of an openly available graph between services. In addition, existing services define relationships differently.

Concern has also focused on the fact that Facebook's social graph is owned by the company and is not shared with other services, giving it a major advantage over other services and preventing its users from taking their graph with them to other services when they wish to do so, such as when a user is dissatisfied with Facebook.

Google has attempted to offer a solution to this problem by creating the Social Graph API, released in January 2008, which allows websites to draw publicly available information about a person to form a portable identity of the individual, in order to represent a user's online identity. This did not, however, experience Google's desired uptake and was thus retired in 2012.

Facebook introduced its own Graph API at the 2010 f8 conference. Both companies monetise collected data sets through direct marketing and social commerce. In December 2016, Microsoft acquired LinkedIn for $26.2 billion.

Lastly, massive use of Social Graph raised ethical questions and confidentiality problems. The Cambridge Analytica scandal in 2018 displayed to the open world how other apps had used data of the social graph to do political profiling, which sparked global outrage. Moreover, extreme personalization algorithms caused another problematic effect – the creation of filter bubble and echo chambers, reinforcing user's existing beliefs which influenced public debates. These concerns led to the adoption of stricter regulations on data protection, like the California Consumer Privacy Act, forcing Facebook to change its way of using data.

== Twitter's social graph ==
As of 2012, Twitter is the most popular micro-blogging service in the world. Unlike classical social networks (e.g., Facebook), the relation between Twitter users is unidirectional, which makes information propagation in Twitter much closer to how information propagates in real life.

In 2012, Twitter's social graph consisted of 537 million Twitter accounts connected by 23.95 billion links.

== Open Graph ==
Facebook's Graph API allows websites to draw information about more objects than simply people, including photos, events, and pages, and their relationships between each other. This expands the social graph concept to more than just relationships between individuals and instead applies it to virtual non-human objects between individuals, as well.

== Other uses of Social Graph ==
The concept of the social graph can be extended to other uses than online social networks. It finds uses in multiple fields where interconnected relationships can be found. For companies, the idea of an Enterprise social graph has been explored.

In sports, most commonly in team's sports, interactions between players and teams can be studied to enhance performances, such as the amount of passes between two specific players in football, proximity and distance between players in basketball. Those interactions can be modeled through a social graph and can lead to strategy optimization. In statistical studies, social graphs can map the spread of diseases in a society.

== See also ==
- Social network
- List of social networking websites
- Social network analysis
- Social network analysis software
- Social web
- Sociomapping
- Sociometry
- Jacob L. Moreno
- Guanxi
