= Robert Saudek =

Czech-born graphologist and writer (1880-1935)

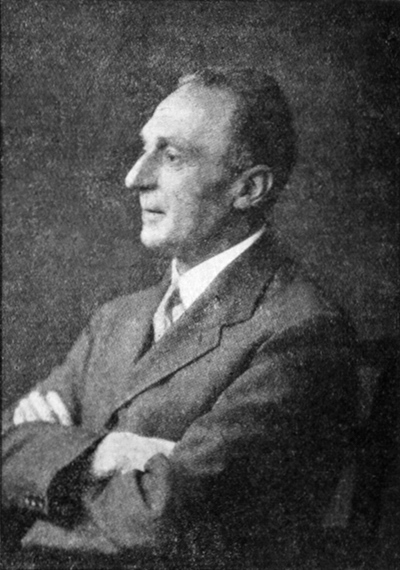
- Born: 21 April 1880; Kolín, Bohemia, Austria-Hungary
- Died: 15 April 1935 (aged 54); London, England
- Occupations: Playwright, diplomat, graphologist

Robert Saudek (21 April 1880 – 15 April 1935) was a Czech-born graphologist, diplomat and writer. He focused on writing novels, stories, poems and plays. He had considerable influence on the content and standing of graphology worldwide. He also published numerous articles in many languages in periodicals as diverse as The Listener, Zeitschrift für Menschenkenntnis and the Journal of Social Psychology. He also founded the professional graphology society in the Netherlands. He also started two academic periodicals: one in Dutch and the other in English. Many graphologists worldwide today use Saudek's work without knowing the origin.

He published Experimental Graphology in 1929. Saudek examined the speed of handwriting. He quantified handwriting by use of a microscope, caliper, pressure board, ruler, protractor and slow-motion pictures. Saudek also attempted to deal with graphological phenomena in terms acceptable to experimental psychologists.

== Life ==
Robert Saudek was born in Kolín, Bohemia, Austria-Hungary (now Czech Republic) on 21 April 1880 (some sources say 1881). He was the son of a manufacturer of feather beds; Robert had a brother and two sisters. He was a polyglot: by the end of his life he had mastered Czech, German, Dutch, French and English.

He studied a correspondence course produced by the well known German graphologist Hans Busse (who incidentally translated Crepieux-Jamin's work into German) and was very familiar with the work of Ludwig Klages. Around 1900 he studied at the Universities of Prague, Leipzig and the Sorbonne. From 1903 to 1909 he authored plays, essays, epigrams and novels. It is reported that he ran an intelligence bureau in The Hague during World War I, from 1914 to 1918.

In 1918 Saudek entered the diplomatic service for the Czechoslovak Government, in the Netherlands and in England. The family settled in The Hague that year. They moved away from the Hague in 1922, living in Berlin until 1924. In 1924 Saudek moved to London, where he was correspondent to the Prager Presse newspaper and established a profitable graphological practice.

== Works ==
In 1918 he authored a novel with a graphological plot, Diplomats, which was published in German, Czech, Dutch, French and Italian (1921). In the 1920s he began the Bulletin of the Dutch Association for Scientific Graphology (Nederlands Tijdschrift Voor Graphologie. Orgaan Van De Vereeniging Voor Wetenschappelijke Grafologie). In 1963 this became Acta Graphologica.

In 1925 Unwin published Psychology of Handwriting; it also appeared in Dutch, German, Danish, and Swedish. Saudek supplemented his income by drawing rents from two large properties in Berlin. He also gave lectures, notably one to the British Psychological Society, Medical section on 21 October 1926, which became an article (see Saudek 1927). He also made radio broadcasts with the BBC; one such broadcast took place on 7 September 1927.

His next book was Experimental Graphology, which appeared in German, Czech and Dutch in 1926. Saudek lectured on experimental graphology at Berlin, Amsterdam, Brussels and Prague from 1926 to 1928.

The book Experiments in Handwriting was published in London in 1928. Possibly related to the book and his lecture tour initiatives, Saudek was awarded a PhD in Brussels, Belgium in the same year. This now meant that he was able to use the title Dr Saudek.

Another book followed in 1932, What Your Handwriting Shows—a shorter, more popular-style book than the others. Then in 1933 Anonymous Letters was published; this concentrated on the criminological aspects of handwriting analysis work.

== Death ==
The Times of 16 April 1935 carried his obituary: "Robert Saudek at the age of 55 years died on 15 April 1935. Born in Bohemia and having lived for some years in London, where he had numerous friends in scientific and journalistic circles." This obituary, though, was slightly inaccurate as Saudek died six days before his 55th birthday.

His death certificate shows that he died at 20 Devonshire Place in London, which was probably a private hospital in 1935. The cause of death was shown as: (a) Septicaemia; (b) Haemorhage (c) Chronic duodenal Ulcer.

His papers are in the Senate House Library, University of London.

== Publications ==
=== Fiction ===
- A Child's conscience and Jewish Youths. 1903.
- Drei Bühnendichtungen der Kinderseele. Berlin, Deutsche Bühne, 1903.
- Drama detske duse. Divadelni knihovna Maje, sv. 9, 1903. Played in National Theatre, Prague opening, 21.9. 1903, director Jaroslav Kvapil (one of the most outstanding Czech directors of the time)
- Eine Gymnasten-Tragödie. Concordia Deutsche Verlag, H. Ehbock – Berlin 1904.
- Revoluce na gymnaziu, tragedy in 4 acts Divadelni knihovna maje, No date: probably 1904.
- Und über uns leuchtende Sterne. 1907.
- With Weininger, Otto. Gedanken über Geschlechtsprobleme. Berlin, Concordia [1907].
- Der Mikado: Ein Seeroman. Concordia. Anstalt H. Ehbock Berlin 1909.
- Die Spielerin. Verlag Von C. Reissuer, Dresden, 1910.
- Der entfesselte Riese (novel). Schuster-Loeffler - Berlin, Leipzig. 1910.
- With Alfred Halm. Das Märchen vom Heiligenwald. Lustspiel in drei Akten. Dresden, Reißner, 1912.
- Eine Heilige und zwei Sünder. Dresden, Reißner 1912.
- Diplomaten: Drei Masken. Munich 1918/1921.
- Damon (novel). Concordia Deutsche Verlag. Anstalt Hermann Ehbock. Berlin.
- Dramen der Kinderseele (in 1 act)
- With Lothar, Rudolph. Kavaliere (3-act comedy). Concordia. Berlin, 1909.
- De Distel - Pietje de Landlooper (3-act play). 2nd ed. Antwerp, 1924.
- Osud (Pátá Symfonie) (3-act play). E. J. Rosendorf, Prague, probably after 1926.

=== Non-fiction ===
1925

- Vědecká grafologie písma, Prague: Orbis (Scientific Graphology – Psychology of Handwriting in Czech)
- Wetenchappelijke Graphologie. De psychologie van het Schrift. The Hague: Leopold.
- The Psychology of Handwriting. London: George Allen & Unwin; New York: George H. Doran Co., 1954; Books for Professionals, 1978.

1926

- Wissenschaftliche Graphologie. Munich: Drei Maskan Verlag.
- "Ein Vorschlag zur Schaffung einer internationalen graphologischen Terminologie". In: Schneickert, Hans: Zweiter Kongress des Deutschen Bundes der gerichtlichen Schriftsachverstandigen und Berufsgraphologen (Sitz Berlin) am 3., 4. und 5. September 1926 in Berlin. Offizieller Bericht. Berlin: A. W. Hayn's Erben, 33–38.

1927

- "Eine Stunde Graphologie". Schünemann—Monat, March, 266–75.
- "The Methods of Graphology". British Journal of Medical Psychology, July, 7(2), 221–59.
- Reading, writing and guessing. Psyche, 30, (8),2. 34-42
- "Wissenschaftliche Graphologie". In: Funk—Stunde (Ed.): Das Wissen im Rundfunk. Eine Auswahl von Rundfunkvorträgen. Berlin, 228–35.
- Preface. Crépieux-Jamin. Die Grundlagen der Graphologie und der Schrift-expertise. Heidelberg.
- "La vitesse et la tension". Bulletins de Graphologie. Societe d'Etudes du Caractère Humain. Lyon 1/1927.

1928

- How to detect Forged Signatures. London: General Press.
- Experimenteele graphologie. The Hague: Leopold.
- "Experimentelle Graphologie". Berliner Illustrirte Zeitung No 19.
- "Kinderhandschriften". Berliner Illustrirte Zeitung No 19.
- "Ehrlichkeit und Unehrlichkeit in der Handschrift. Eine graphologische Studie". Velhagen und Klasings Monatshefte, 42(7), 49–56.
- "Lesen, Schreiben und Erraten". Schriftpsychologie 49 p. 36.
- "Experimentelle graphologie". Archiv für Kriminologie, (Sep), 83(2), 103–95.
- Experiments with Handwriting. New York: Doubleday/William Morrow, 1929; London: George Allen & Unwin, 1928; Books for Professionals, 1978.
- Experimentální grafologie (Experimental Graphology), Prague: Aventinum, Prague
- "Zentralnervensystem und Schreiben". Ztsch. Cas. lek ceste 2, pp. 1224–35; 1262–68.

1929

- "Verbundene und unverbundene Schrift". Schrift und Schreiben, 1(5), 131–35.
- Experimentelle Graphologie. Berlin: Pan.
- Experimentelle Graphologie. The Hague: HPL Uitgevers.
- "Das zentrale Nervensystem und der Schreibakt" (Central nervous system and character of handwriting). Jahrbuch der Charakterologie, 6, 275–303.
- "Die Pathologischen Merkmale in der Handschrift". Soziale Medizin 2(12) 587–98
- "Anonime Briefschreiber". Berliner Illustrirte Zeitung No 30. 28 July 1929.
- "Les indices de Malhonnêteté dans l'écriture". Graphologie Scientifique 29: 185–91.
- "Experimental graphology". Sci. Pro. 23, pp. 468–86.
- Zur experimentellen Graphologie". Psychologie und Medizin, Stuttgart, a.4, pp. 229–43; 1931, a.6, pp. 229–44.

1930

- "On Crepieux-Jamin". Tribute. Papers of the 2nd International Congress on Graphology, Paris 9–11 June 1928 pp. 23–24. English translation by Nigel Bradley in The Graphologist 21(1) No 78 Spring 2003 p. 22.
- "Les indices de Malhonnêteté dans l'écriture". Graphologie Scientifique 33: 233–37.
- "Ce que le cinéma nous enseigne sur les mouvements d'écriture". Société de Graphologie. Papers of the 2nd International Congress on Graphology, Paris 9–11 June 1928 pp. 223–72.
- "Betonung und Unterbetonung von Wortanfängen und Wortenden als charakterologische und psychopathologische Merkmale der Schrift". Zeitschrift für angewandte Psychologie, 37, 99–134.
- "Graphological Analysis of Freud's Handwriting". Report dated 29 April. (Sigmund Freud Archive Container B45, Library of Congress, Washington DC.)
- "Entgegnung". (Response to: Dr. A. Ackermann: "Neuere graphologische Literatur".

Zeitschrift für Menschenkunde, 5(5) 314–20.) Zentralblatt für Graphologie, 1(1) 70-73. Zeitschrift für Menschenkunde, 6.

- "Die Handschrift erfolgreicher Menschen". (Includes handwriting of among others: Albert Ballin, Walther Rathenau, Karl Marx, Immanuel Kant, Maximilian Harden, Otto von Bismarck). Westermanns Monatshefte, September p. 889.
- "Einige Bemerkungen zur Frage: Ist die Graphologie zuverlässig?" Zeitschrift für gerichtliche Schriftuntersuchungen, 21.
- Preface to: Cyrus Harry Brooks. Your Character from your Handwriting: The New Graphology. London: Allen und Unwin.
- Preface to: Cyrus Harry Brooks. Praktisches Lehrbuch der Graphologie. Nach der Methode Robert Saudek. Leipzig.
- "Damen-Handschriften". Die Dame. 57(10) pp. 12, 14, 40.

1931

- "Schreibgelaufigkeit von österreichischen Kindern und Erwachsenen". Zentralblatt für Graphologie, 1(6) 477. Zeitschrift für Menschenkunde, 6.
- "Writing movements as indications of the writer's social behaviour". Journal of Social Psychology, 2(3) 337–73.
- "Zur psychodiagnostischen Ausdeutung des Schreibdrucks" (Psychodiagnostic value of pen pressure). Zeitschrift für angewandte Psychologie, July, 39(6), 443–49.
- "Zur experimentellen Graphologie" (Experimental graphology). Psychologie und Medizin, 4(7) (May) 229–43.
- "Zur Psychologie der amerikanischen Handschrift". (Psychology of American handwriting). Zentralblatt für Graphologie, 1(5), 361–96. Zeitschrift für Menschenkenntnis 6 pp. 239–74.
- "Moderne graphologische Untersuchungsmethoden". Berliner Illustrirte Zeitung 44.

1932

- with Seeman, Ernest. "Handschriften und Zeichnungen eineiiger Zwillinge". Charakter, 1(4), 193–230.
- "Gandhi. Eine graphologische Charakterstudie". Vossische Zeitung 1/2.
- "Pubertätsjahre im englischen Internat". Charakter, 1, 12–26.
- "Zur Psychologie des Bewerbungsschreiben". Charakter, 1, 137–47.
- "The years of puberty in a public school". Character and Personality, 1(1), 17–34.
- What your Handwriting Shows. London: T. Werner Laurie.
- With Seeman, Ernest. "The Self-expression of Identical Twins in Handwriting and Drawing". Character and Personality 1(2) (December) 91–128.

1933

- "Identische, getrennt erzogene Zwillinge. Eine vergleichende Studie verschiedener Methoden zur Ermittelung ihrer intellektuellen und gefühlsmäßigen Reaktionen". Charakter, 2, 132–46.
- Zločin v piśme – Grafologie v soudní síni (Crime in Handwriting – Graphology in Court). Prague: Orbis.
- Anonymous Letters. A Study in Crime and Handwriting. London: Methuen; New York: AMS Press, 1976.
- With Seeman, Ernest. Handschriften und Zeichnungen eineiiger Zwillinge. Schriftenreihe zur graphologischen Zwillingsforschung 1. Berlin: Pan.
- With Seeman, Ernest. "Die Handschrift eineiiger, getrennt erzogener Zwillinge". Charakter, 2. 66–81.
- With Seeman, Ernest. "The Handwriting of Identical twins reared apart". Character and Personality, 1(4) (June) 268–85.
- "Identical twins reared apart: a comparative study of various tests of their intellectual, emotional and social attitudes". Character and Personality, 2(1), 22–40.
- "Können verschiedene Schreiber gleiche Schriften schreiben?" Charakter, 2, 191–203; Vierteljahresschrift für angewandte Kriminalistik 7(1) 1935, 35—50.
- Handschrift en misdaad, de graphologie in de rechtszaal. The Hague: Leopold, 1933.
- Hvad Deres Haandskrift røber. Copenhagen/Oslo: Jespersen og Pios Forlag.

1934

- "Ein britisches Paar erbgleicher, getrennt erzogener Zwillinge". Charakter, 3(3/4), 118–46.
- "A British pair of identical twins reared apart". Character and Personality, 3(1), 17–39.
- "Can different writers produce identical handwritings?" Character and Personality 2(3), 231–45.
- "Bestimmung persoenlicher Interessen durch Testpsychologie und graphologische Methoden". Charakter, 1, 19–26.

1935

- "Can different writers write with identical handwriting". Vierteljahreszeitschrift für angewandte Kriminalistik, 35–50.
- "Die Handschrift von gleicherbigen Zwillingen". CIBA-Zeitschrift, 2, 789–
