= Laroche-près-Feyt =

- Commune
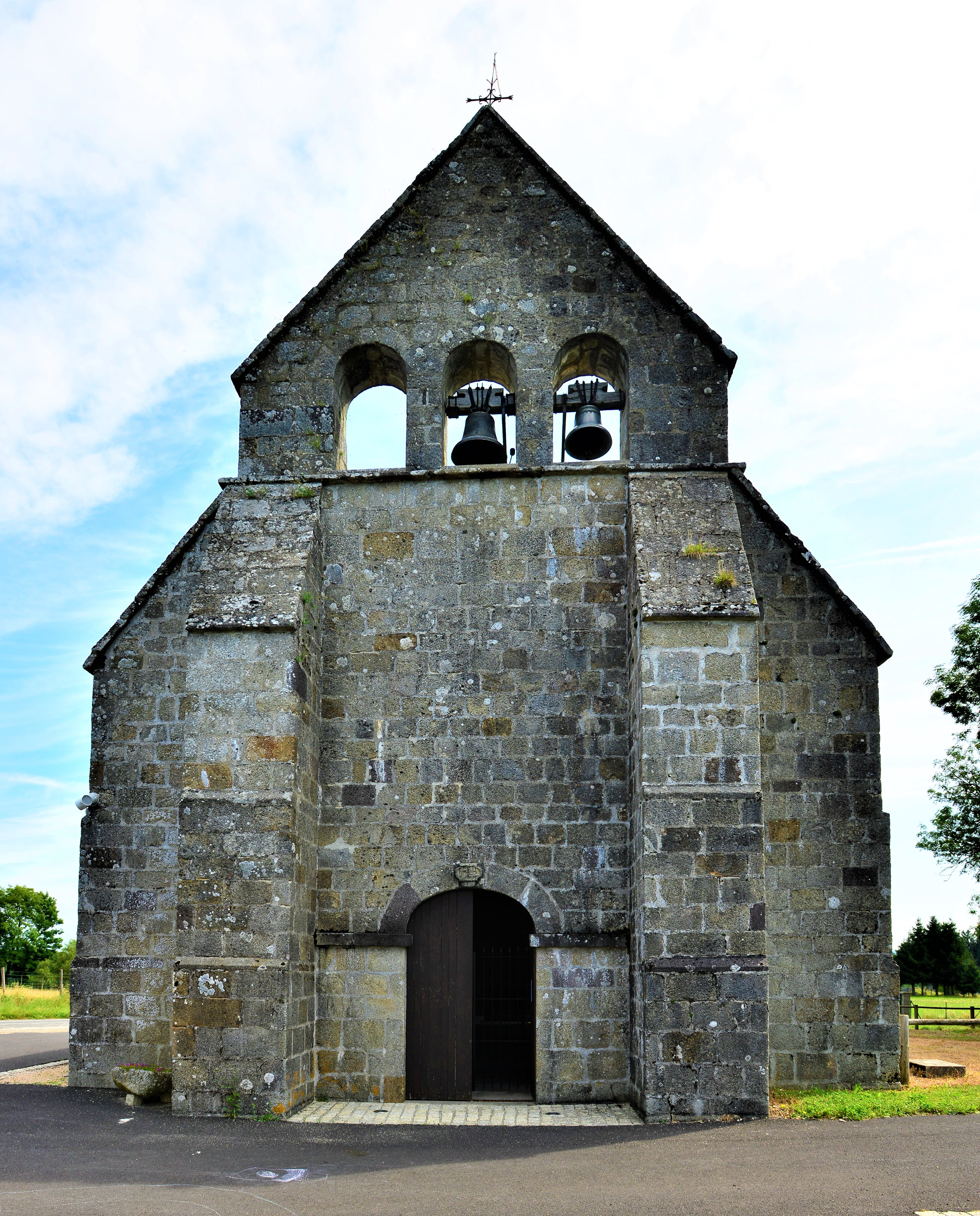
- The church
- Location of Laroche-près-Feyt
- Location within France Location within Nouvelle-Aquitaine
- Coordinates: 45°42′21″N 2°30′27″E
- Country: France
- Region: Nouvelle-Aquitaine
- Department: Corrèze
- Arrondissement: Ussel
- Canton: Ussel
- Intercommunality: Haute-Corrèze Communauté

Government
  - Mayor (2020–2026): Pierre Chevalier
- Area^{1}: 17.24 km^{2} (6.66 sq mi)
- Highest elevation: 775 m (2,543 ft)
- Lowest elevation: 650 m (2,130 ft)
- Population (2023): 80
  - Density: 4.6/km^{2} (12/sq mi)
- Time zone: UTC+01:00 (CET)
  - Summer (DST): UTC+02:00 (CEST)
- INSEE/Postal code: 19108 /19340
- ^{1} French Land Register data, which excludes lakes, ponds, glaciers > 1 km^{2} (0.386 sq mi or 247 acres) and river estuaries.

Laroche-près-Feyt is a commune in the Corrèze department in central France.

== Geography ==
The Chavanon forms the commune's eastern boundary.

== Population ==
Historical population
Year	Pop.	±% p.a.
1968	159	—
1975	103	−6.01%
1982	115	+1.59%
1990	106	−1.01%
1999	82	−2.81%
2007	79	−0.46%
2012	74	−1.30%
2017	63	−3.17%
2023	80	+4.06%
Source: INSEE

== Notable people ==
The following were born in Laroche-près-Feyt:

- Pierre Flote (middle of 13th century - 11 July 1302), possibly born here, Chancellor to Philip IV, le Bel, éventuellement né à Laroche-près-Feyt.
- Pierre de Besse (1567 - 11 November 1639), preacher to Louis XIII.
- Jean-Hippolyte Michon (1806-1881), priest, archaeologist, inventor of graphology.

== See also ==
- Communes of the Corrèze department
