= Jean-Charles Gille =

Jean-Charles Gille-Maisani
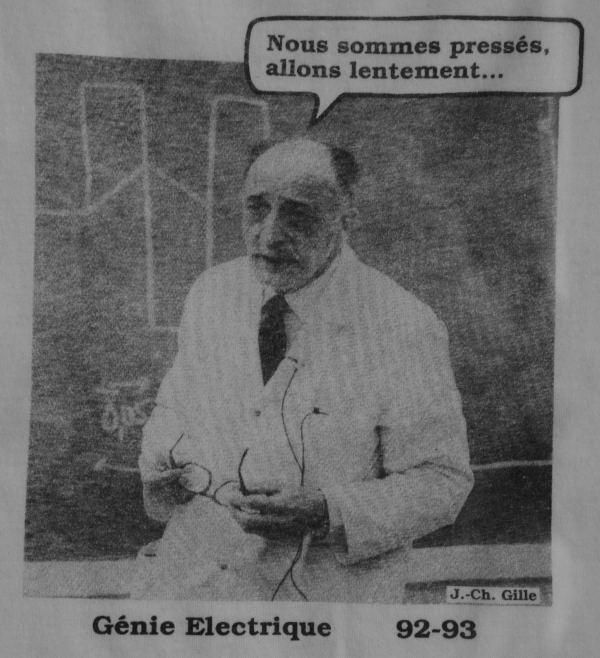
- Monsieur Gille during a class of EE, Laval University.
- Born: 22 May 1924; Trier
- Died: 29 January 1995; Quebec City
- Education: MA (automation) Harvard; MD, PhD (psychiatry)
- Occupation(s): Professor, psychiatrist, graphologist

Cover of one of Gille's books.

Dr. Jean-Charles Gille-Maisani (22 May 1924 – 29 January 1995) was a French, later Canadian, engineer, psychiatrist and professor of medicine.

Gille was born in Trier (Germany), where his father, originally from Lorraine, was a superior officer in the French garrison. He learned German early in life and moved on to learn French, English, Italian, Spanish, Russian and Polish, as well as Latin and Ancient Greek.

He entered the École Polytechnique in 1943. After graduation, and a year of specialization at the École nationale supérieure de l'Aéronautique, he studied at Harvard where he received a Master of Arts degree in the newly created automation discipline. Back in France in 1948, he entered the Services techniques aéronautiques and worked in the engines and special objects. He was also a certified pilot and colonel.

In 1953, he started studying medicine, and received a Ph.D. in 1960, with a specialisation in psychiatry and psychology. At the same time, he was director of studies at the E.N.S. de l'Aéronautique (Paris) and created, in 1962, with Marc Pélegrin, the Centre d'études et de recherches en automatique (CERA) which expanded rapidly, having in 1965, 70 to 80 employees.

In 1963, he was a defense witness at the trial of Jean Bastien-Thiry, one of the perpetrators of an assassination attempt against President de Gaulle.

In 1966, he left France to live in Quebec, Canada, where he was already an established visiting professor. Until pancreatic cancer caused his death in 1995, he was titular professor in the Faculty of Sciences and Engineering, Département de Génie Électrique electrical engineering, Université Laval in Quebec City.

Beside engineering and medicine, his fields of interest also included graphology, classical music and poetry. He was Honoris Causa Doctor of Silesian University of Technology and a member of the Polish Academy of Sciences.

== Publications ==
- Dynamique de la Commande Linéaire (with Decaulne, Paul and Pelegrin, Marc), Paris : Dunod, 1967.
- Psychologie de l'écriture : études de graphologie. Paris : Payot, 1969. ISBN 9782296028265
- Écritures de poètes de Byron à Baudelaire / J.-Ch. Gille-Maisani. Dervy-Livres, 1977.
- Types de Jung et tempéraments psychobiologiques : expression dans l'écriture, corrélation avec le groupe sanguin, utilisation en psychologie appliquée Paris : Maloine; Saint-Hyacinthe, Québec : Edisem, 1978.
- Calcul matriciel et introduction à l'analyse fonctionnelle : pour ingénieurs (with Marc Clique) Editions Lidec, 1979.
- Ecritures de poètes : de Byron à Beaudelaire Dervy-Livres, 1977
- Écritures de compositeurs, de Beethoven a Debussy. Musique et graphologie., 1978
- Calcul matriciel et introduction à l'analyse fonctionnelle : pour ingénieurs (with Marc Clique) 2nd ed. Paris : Éditions Eyrolles; Montréal : Éditions Lidec, 1981.
- Calcul matriciel et introduction à l'analyse fonctionnelle(with Marc Clique), 3rd ed. Lidec, 1984.
- Calcul matriciel : exercices et problèmes avec solutions (with Marc Clique), 1st ed. Lidec, 1984.
- Adam Mickiewicz, poète national de la Pologne : étude psychanalytique et caractérologique Bellarmin, 1987.
- Calcul matriciel : exercices et problèmes avec solutions (with Marc Clique), 2nd ed. Lidec, 1988.
- Calcul matriciel et introduction à l'analyse fonctionnelle (with Marc Clique), 4th ed. rev. and expanded. Lidec, 1989.
- Węgrzyn, S. (Stefan). Developmental systems at the crossroads of system theory, computer science, and genetic engineering / S. Węgrzyn, J.-C. Gille, P. Vidal. Springer-Verlag, 1990.
- Węgrzyn, Stefan. Developmental systems : at the crossroads of system theory, computer science, and genetic engineering / S. Węgrzyn, J.-C. Gille, P. Vidal. Springer-Verlag, 1990.
- Dynamique de la commande linéaire / par Jean-Charles Gille, Paul Decaulne, Marc Pélegrin, 9th ed.
- Systèmes linéaires : problèmes avec solutions Lidec, 1992.
- Servosistemas : teoría y calculo (with P. Decaulne, M. Pelegrin; translated by Antonio Diez Moreno) 2nd ed. Dunod
- The Psychology of Handwriting, Scriptor Books, 1989.
- S. Węgrzyn, J.-C. Gille, P. Vidal. Developmental Systems: At the Crossroads of System Theory, Computer Science and Genetic Engineering Springer-Verlag Berlin and Heidelberg GmbH & Co. K 1990
- Poets' Handwritings, (translated by Robert Laversuch) Scriptor Books, 1995.
