= Rafael Schermann =

Polish graphologist, self-proclaimed psychic and writer

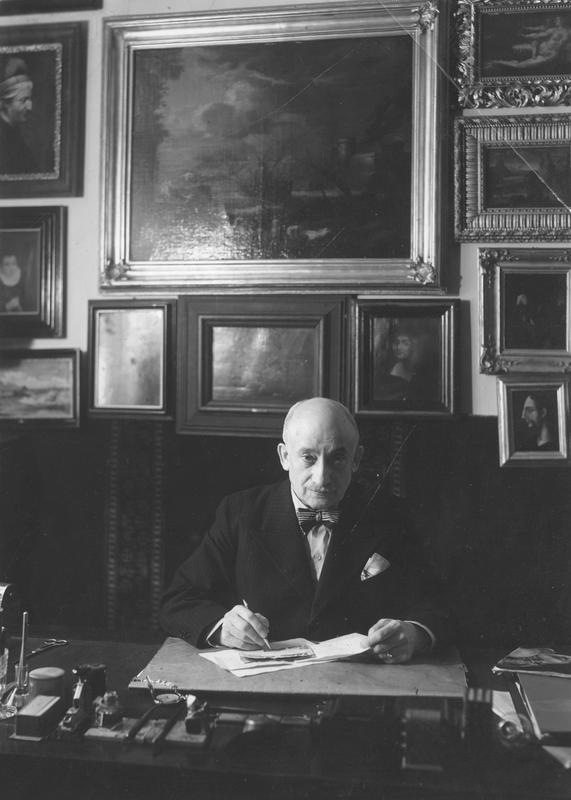
Rafael Schermann

Rafael Schermann (1879–1945) also known as Raphael Schermann was a Polish graphologist, self-proclaimed psychic and writer.

Schermann was born in Kraków. From a young age, he had a fascination with handwriting and collecting envelopes. He settled in Vienna in 1910 and worked for insurance companies. He became an expert graphologist and it was alleged that he possessed the powers of clairvoyance, second sight and telepathy.

Oskar Fischer, a professor of psychology from the University of Prague, conducted a series of graphology experiments with Schermann between 1916 and 1918. Fischer reported that with his eyes bandaged, or by just touching handwriting samples in sealed envelopes, Schermann had successfully given many accurate character descriptions and statements about the writer. Fischer became convinced that Schermann was a genuine psychic.

Other researchers have been more critical. Brazilian physician Antônio da Silva Melo noted flaws in the experiments and attributed his graphology abilities to psychological factors relating to memory, unconscious cues and suggestion.

== Publications ==
- Die Handschrift Luegt Nicht (Handwriting Does Not Lie, 1929)
- Pismo Nie Kłamie: Psychografologia. Kraków: Księg. Powszechna, 1939 (wznowiona 1993, 1999)
- Hilfe! Mörder!. Berlin-Leipzig: Verl. Schaefer & Co., 1932
- Trzy Testamenty Księcia X. Kraków: Senzacja, 1935
- O pół minuty... Kraków: Senzacja, 1935
- Samobójstwo zmarłego (1937; Wznowiona 2014)
