= Camillo Baldi =

Italian philosopher

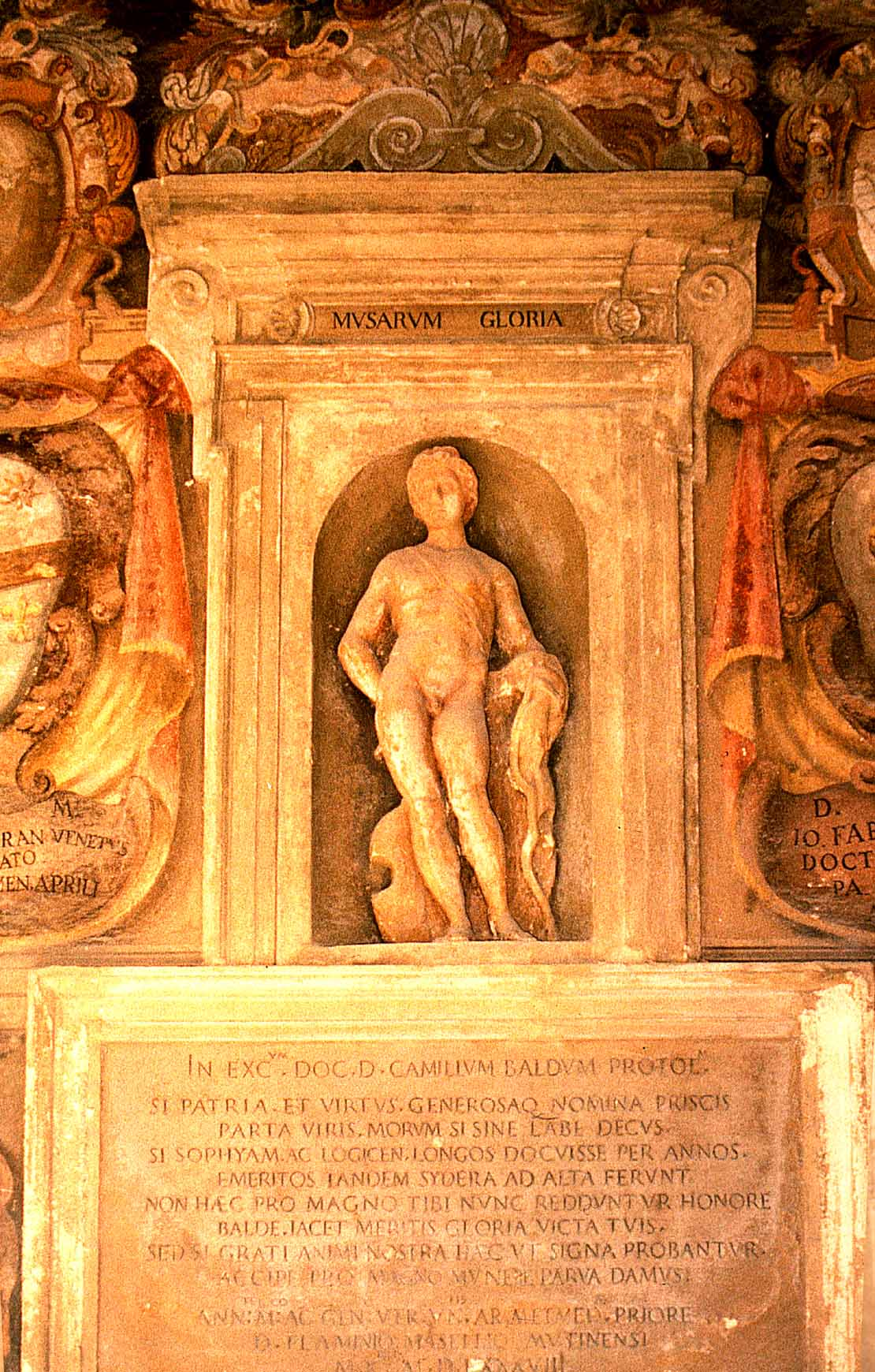
- Monument to Baldi in the courtyard of the Archiginnasio of Bologna
- Born: 1550; Bologna, Italy
- Died: 24 March 1637 (aged 86–87); Bologna, Italy
- Occupation: Professor

Camillo Baldi (1550 – 24 March 1637), also known as Camillus Baldus and Camillo Baldo, was an Italian philosopher.

== Life ==
He was born into a family of minor Bolognese nobility. In 1572 he graduated in Philosophy and Medicine (what would now be called Natural Sciences). His father Pietro Maria Baldi was a lecturer at the University of Bologna and Camillo followed in his footsteps teaching there for sixty years. He started teaching in 1576, teaching Aristotelian logic until 1579 when he was promoted to a junior lectureship in philosophy which he held till 1586. From 1586 to 1590 he held the post of 'Protologicus'. This was a position that seems to have been created specifically for Baldi and little is known about what it involved. He was then made a senior lecturer in philosophy from 1590 till his death in 1637. In this role he would have lectured on six works of natural philosophy by Aristotle, one per year in a six-year cycle. In his sixty-year career at the University Baldi merited three memorials from his students (two painted on the walls of the lecture hall and one statue in the courtyard). It is almost unheard of for lecturers to get so much praise, so it is clear he was a popular teacher. He also held many roles within the university hierarchy, including that of 'Decano' (Dean) and 'Procancelliere'. He was also curator of the Aldrovandi museum from 1620 till his death in 1637. One of Baldi's students was the poet Alessandro Tassoni. Baldi is mentioned in several of Tassoni's published letters. In Tassoni's famous poem La secchia rapita Baldi is introduced as the ambassador of the Bolognese to Modena, the Modenese having stolen a symbolic bucket from Bologna, Baldi is sent to negotiate for its return.

== The earliest work of Graphology ==
Baldi left behind numerous printed and manuscript works covering a wide range of subjects. The best known is his essay on graphology, Trattato Come Da Una Lettera Missiva Si Conoscano La Natura E Qualità Dello Scrittore which represents the first detailed investigation of the subject. It was first published in 1622 when Baldi was over 70 years old, and Italian editions were also published in 1625, 1983 and 1992). There are no published English translations, but it has also appeared in Latin (1664), French (1900 and 1993), and Spanish (2016). It is firmly rooted in the lively tradition of vernacular letter-writing manuals of the sixteenth and early seventeenth centuries in Italy. It is heavily indebted to the classical Greek work De elocutione (On style) attributed to Demetrius Phalereus. Baldi is following Demetrius when he condemns those whose style is too artificial, for, he says such people reveal nothing of themselves, all that one can tell of them is that they are shrewd and artificial. He goes on to say: 'when they are written without artifice or erudition or any consideration at all, but only as his nature dictates to him, then one can probably tell many things about the writer'. Baldi only devotes a few pages (18–21) to considerations of handwriting but it is on this that his fame (such as it is) rests. His interpretations of handwriting are interesting but have little connection to modern theories of graphology. For instance: 'if the writing is both fast, even and well-formed, and appears to have been written with pleasure, it has probably been written by a man who knows nothing and is worthless, because you rarely find intelligent and prudent men who write neatly... these writers are also often cold, avaricious, foolish, intemperate and indiscreet'. On the other hand, he talks of writing that is 'unbecoming, crooked, badly formed and quick, yet legible'. Such writing denotes a mature man who has written a lot. Later he says 'if the handwriting is uneven, with lines that are wavy and generally ascending, such a person is naturally inclined to dominate... with such instability one can also add that he is likely to be choleric and apt to be unrestrained in following his desires'.

== Other works ==
- In physiognomica Aristotelis commentarii. This is a very long commentary on the very short pseudo-Aristotelian work on physiognomy. It is one of Baldi's most widely circulated books with copies in many European libraries.
- Alcune considerationi sopra una lettera d'Anton Perez scritta al duca di Lerma circa al modo di conservarsi in gratia del suo signore
- Trattato del modo di scriver bene una lettera
- Delle mentite et offese di parole, come possino accomodarsi. This work was published several times and is the most widely available of Baldi's Italian works. It is on the subject of duelling and more specifically on how to avoid becoming involved in a duel.
- De naturali ex unguium inspectione praesagio commentarius
- De humanarum propensionum ex temperamento praenotionibus
- Congressi civili... ne quali, con precetti morali e politici, si mostra il modo facile d'acquistar e conservar gli amici
- Alchemia e la sua medicina - this work was never published but exists in manuscript and was subject of a recent academic article.
