= Enterprise social graph =

An enterprise social graph is a representation of the extended social network of a business, encompassing relationships among its employees, vendors, partners, customers, and the public. With the advent of Web 2.0 and Enterprise 2.0 technologies a company can monitor and act on these relationships in real-time. Given the number of relationships and the volume of associated data, algorithmic approaches are used to focus attention on changes that are deemed relevant.

== Origin ==
The term was first popularized in a 2010 Forbes article, to describe the multi-relational nature of enterprise-centric networks that are now at least partially observable at scale. The enterprise social graph integrates representations of the various social networks in which the enterprise is embedded into a unified graph representation. Given the online context of many of the relationships, social interactions often comprise direct communication along with interactions around digital artifacts. Therefore, the enterprise social graph codifies not only relationships among individuals but also individual-object interaction patterns. This definition follows Facebook's and Google's concept of a social graph that explicitly includes the objects with which individuals interact in a network.

Examples of these relationship patterns can include authorship, sharing or sending information, management or other social hierarchy, bookmarking, and other gestural signals that describe a relationship between two or more nodes. Additional representational challenges arise with the need to capture interaction dynamics and their changing social context over time, and as such, representational choices vary based ultimately on the analytic questions that are of interest.

Besides being a specialized type of social graph, the enterprise social graph is related to network science and graph theory.

== Applications ==
Changes in how people connect, share, accomplish tasks through online social networks, combined with the growth of ambient public information relevant to an enterprise, contribute to the dynamism and increasing complexity of enterprise social graphs. Whereas meetings, phone calls, or email have been the traditional media for these exchanges, increasingly collaboration and conversation occurs via online social media. As Kogut and Zander point out, the more tacit knowledge is, the more difficult and expensive it is to transmit, since the costs of codifying and teaching will rise as tacitness increases. The consumerization of social business software enables simpler and more cost-effective ways making relationships and tacit knowledge both observable and actionable.

From an internal enterprise perspective, understanding the enterprise social graph can provide greater awareness of internal dynamics, organizational and information flow inefficiencies, information seeking and expert identification, or exposing opportunities for new valued connections. From an external perspective, it can provide deeper insights into marketplace conditions and customer demand, customer issues and concerns, product development and co-creation, supply-side operational awareness or external causal relationships.

Recent developments in big data analysis, combined with graph mining techniques, make it possible to analyze petabytes of structured and unstructured information and feed user-facing applications. In making use of the enterprise social graph, such applications excel at search, routing, and matching operations, particularly where these include personalization, statistical analysis and machine learning. Examples of applications that combine big data mining techniques over the enterprise social graph include business intelligence, personalized activity streams and intelligent filtering, social search, recommendation engines, automated question or message routing, expertise identification, and information context discovery.
