= Max Pulver =

Swiss graphologist (1889–1952)

- Born: 6 December 1889; Bern, Switzerland
- Died: 13 June 1952 (aged 62); Zürich, Switzerland
- Occupations: Writer, poet, philosopher, and psychoanalyst

Max Pulver is the author of four graphology books (1931, 1934, 1944 and 1949), several articles, and one novel (1927). He developed the theory of symbolism of space. His work discusses pressure, intelligence, and crime. He founded the Schweizerische Graphologische Gesellschaft (Swiss Graphological Society) in 1950 and was president until his death.

== Theories ==
Pulver's approach to graphology was influenced by the psychoanalytic theories of Sigmund Freud, examining handwriting to understand the writer's personality and subconscious mind.

Major symbolism starts with the point, and examines where and how it travels. This travel is not restricted to strokes. It can be equally applied to white space within a page, or the page as a whole. Minor symbolism looks at the stroke structures, or sequence of stroke structures, reflecting upon what they are symbols of. Within this context, a strong leftward moving stroke through a signature would be symbolic of removing one's self from life. How that removal manifests depends upon what else is contained within the handwriting.

== Works ==
=== Books ===
Himmelpfortgasse. Munich: Kurt Wolff, 1927. A novel about cocaine use in 1920s Europe.

Symbolik der Handschrift. Zurich & Leipzig: Orell Füssli, 1931. Reprinted by Orell Füssli in 1940, 1945, 1949, and 1955. Reprinted by Kindler in 1964, with a new edition published by Kindler in 1972. This book introduced the idea that handwriting can be examined in three horizontal zones: upper strokes, main letters, and downstrokes loosely correlated with the Freud's idea of the super-ego, ego, and id.

Trieb und Verbrechen in der Handschrift: Ausdrucksbilder asozialer Persönlichkeit. Zurich & Leipzig: Orell Füssli, 1934. Reprinted by Orell Füssli in 1934, with a revised edition in 1948.

Person, Charakter, Schicksal. Zurich: Orell Füssli, 1944. Reprinted by Orell Füssli in 1948.

Intelligenz im Schriftausdruck. Zurich: Orell Füssli, 1949.

=== Articles ===
Pulver, Max (1930). "Symbolik des Schrifitfeldes". Zeitschrift für Menschenkunde. 6: 63–60.

Pulver, Max (1930). "Symbolik des Schrifitfeldes". Zentralblatt für Graphologie. 1: 53–63.

Pulver, Max (1930). "Der Druck". Zeitschrift für Menschenkunde. 6: 229–250.

Pulver, Max (1930). "Der Druck". Zentralblatt für Graphologie. 1: 181–202.

Pulver, Max (1931). "De Groote van het schrift". Tijdschrift voor Wetenschappelijke Graphologie. 3 (1).

Pulver, Max (1931). "De Groote van het schrift". Tijdschrift voor Wetenschappelijke Graphologie. 3 (3).

Pulver, Max (1950). "Les Quatre Aspects du trait". La Graphologie. 39: 3–17.

Pulver, Max (1953). "Zur Schrift von Arthur Schopenhauer". Psychologe. 5: 153–155.
