= Jules Crépieux-Jamin =

French graphologist

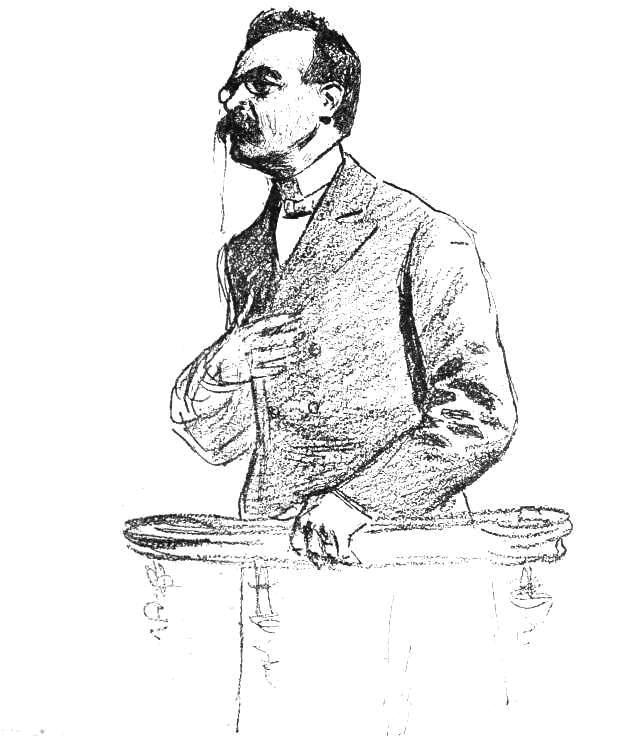
Jules Crépieux-Jamin testifying at the thirteenth session of the Zola Trial. Illustration by Louis Rémy Sabattier for l'Illustration

Jules Crépieux-Jamin (1859–1940) was a French graphologist born in Arras.

From 1889 Crépieux-Jamin worked as a dentist in Rouen. He was deeply interested in the works of Jean-Hippolyte Michon (1806–1881), who is considered to be the founder of modern graphology (science of handwriting analysis). For much of his career Crépieux-Jamin analyzed and revised Michon's work, which included reclassification and re-grouping the system of "handwriting signs", and developing new rules on their classification.

In his 1929 book ABC de la graphologie he laid out a classification system of seven categories in which 175 graphological signs are grouped. The seven categories he used are titled: Dimension, Form, Pressure, Speed, Direction, Layout and Continuity. As an example the category "Form" would contain various graphological signs such as: "rounded", "ornate", "harmonious", "confused", et al.

Crepieux-Jamin took a "holistic approach" to handwriting analysis, and to every element in the handwriting he applied a range of hypothetical meanings, maintaining that the value of a particular sign is not fixed, and its importance and interpretation are variable depending on other aspects in the writing being analyzed.

== Writings ==
- Traité Pratique de Graphologie, Flammarion, Paris
- L'écriture et le caractère (1888), PUF, Paris, 1951, 441 pages --- Handwriting and expression
- La graphologie en exemples (1898), Larousse, Paris.-- Graphology in examples
- Les Bases fondamentales de la Graphologie et de l'expertise en écritures (1921)-- The fundamentals of graphology and expertise in writing
- L'Age et le sexe dans l'écriture (1924), Adyar, Paris --- Age and sex in handwriting
- Les éléments de l'écriture des canailles (1925), Flammarion, Paris.---The elements of the writing of scoundrels.
- L'ABC de la graphologie (1929), PUF, 1960, 667 pages--- The ABC of graphology.
- Libres propos sur l'expertise en écritures et les leçons de l'Affaire Dreyfus, Alcan, 1935 --- On free writing expertise and lessons of the Dreyfus Affair.
