= Literomancy =

Fortune-telling based on written words

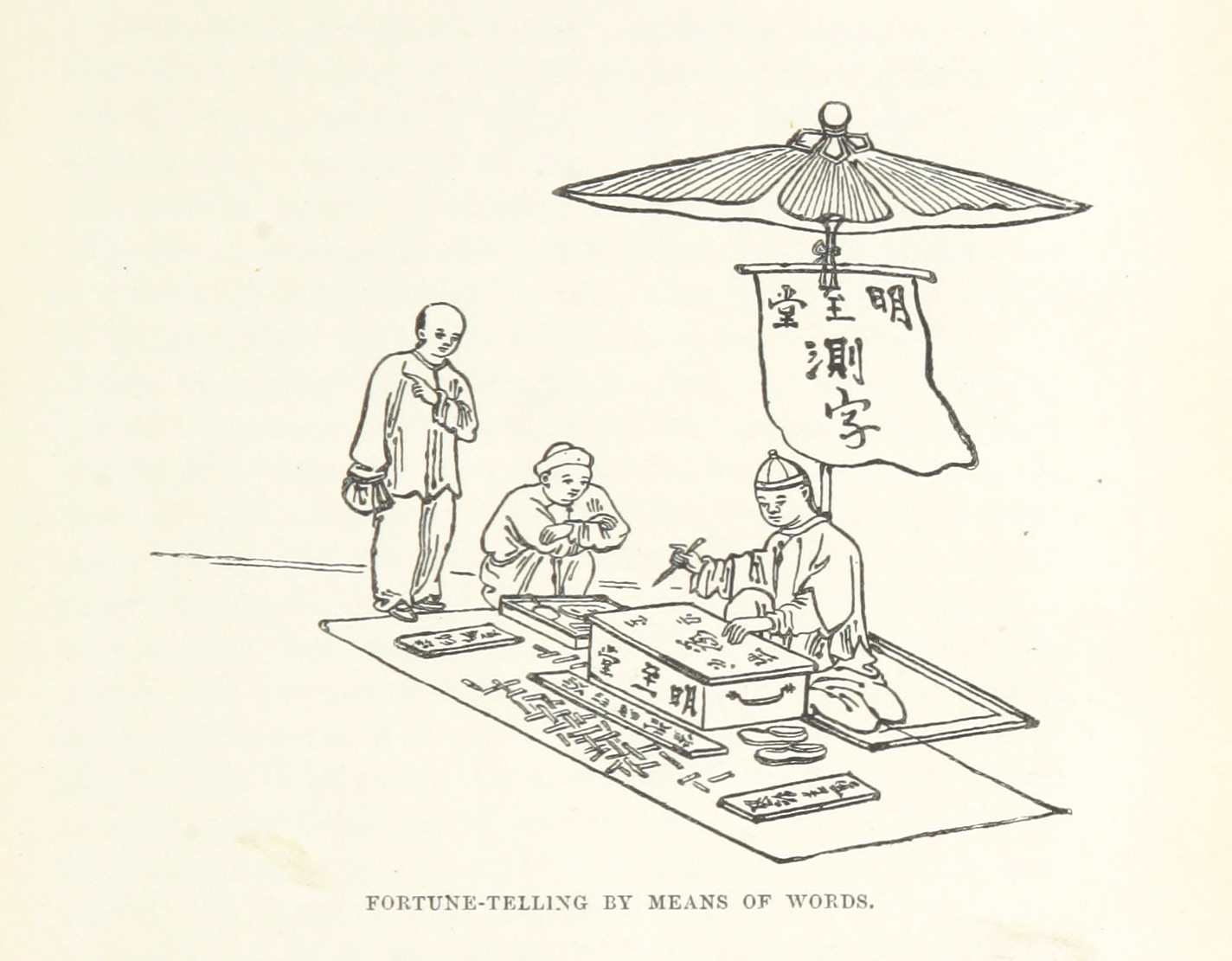
Illustration taken from page 31 of China, a History of the Laws, Manners, and Customs of the People, edited by W. G. Gregor, depicting literomancy

Literomancy, from the Latin litero-, 'letter' + -mancy, 'divination', is a form of fortune-telling based on written words, or, in the case of Chinese, characters. A fortune-teller of this type is known as a literomancer. (simplified Chinese: 测字; traditional Chinese: 測字; pinyin: cèzì)

When practicing literomancy, the client puts up a subject, be it a single character or a name. The literomancer then analyzes the subject, the client's choice of subject or other information related to the subject, along with other information he sees in the client or that the client supplies to arrive at a divination.

Some literomancers can read the curves and lines of a signature as signed by an individual, just as a professional handwriting analyst might, but uses instinct and divination techniques rather than applied analysis skills.

As a superstition, literomancy is practised in Chinese-speaking communities and known as 测字; 測字; cèzì. The subjects of a literomancy are traditionally single characters, plus the requesting person's name—it is often believed that the glyphs in Chinese names bear particular portents. In modern times, elements such as foreign words or even more recently, e-mail addresses and instant message handles have come into use as a subject.

== See also ==
- Graphology
