= Graphology =

Pseudoscientific analysis of handwriting

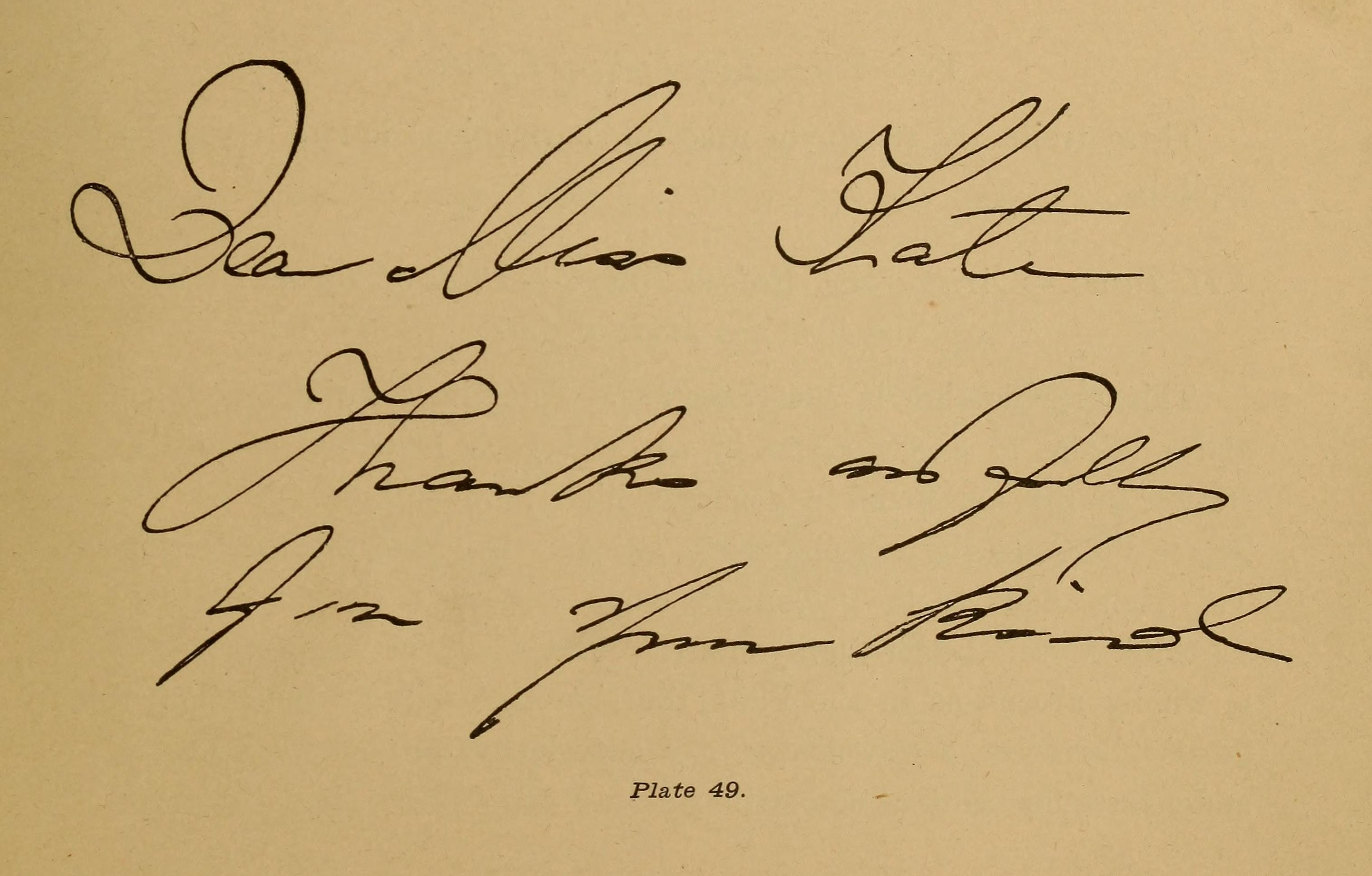
A piece of handwriting used in graphological analysis, supposedly showing traits of "frivolity" and "triviality" in the writer

Graphology is the analysis of handwriting in an attempt to determine the writer's personality traits. Its methods and conclusions are not supported by scientific evidence, and as such it is considered to be a pseudoscience.

Graphology has been controversial for more than a century. Although proponents point to positive testimonials as anecdotal evidence of its utility for personality evaluation, these claims have not been supported by scientific studies. It has been rated as among the most discredited methods of psychological analysis by a survey of mental health professionals.

== Etymology ==
The word "graphology" derives from the Greek γραφή (grapho-; 'writing'), and λόγος (logos; 'theory').

== History ==
In 1991, Jean-Charles Gille-Maisani stated that Juan Huarte de San Juan's 1575 Examen de ingenios para las ciencias was the first book on handwriting analysis. In American graphology, Camillo Baldi's Trattato come da una lettera missiva si conoscano la natura e qualità dello scrittore from 1622 is considered to be the first book.

Around 1830, Jean-Hippolyte Michon became interested in handwriting analysis. He published his findings shortly after founding Société Graphologique in 1871. The most prominent of his disciples was Jules Crépieux-Jamin, who rapidly published a series of books that were soon published in other languages. Starting from Michon's integrative approach, Crépieux-Jamin founded a holistic approach to graphology.

Alfred Binet was convinced to conduct research into graphology from 1893 to 1907. He called it "the science of the future" despite rejection of his results by graphologists.

French psychiatrist Joseph Rogues De Fursac combined graphology and psychiatry in the 1905 book Les ecrits et les dessins dans les maladies mentales et nerveuses.

After World War I, interest in graphology continued to spread in Europe and the United States. In Germany during the 1920s, Ludwig Klages founded and published his findings in Zeitschrift für Menschenkunde (Journal for the Study of Mankind). His major contribution to the field can be found in Handschrift und Charakter.

Thea Stein Lewinson and J. Zubin modified Klage's ideas, based upon their experience working for the U.S. government, publishing their method in 1942.

In 1929, Milton Bunker founded The American Grapho Analysis Society teaching graphoanalysis. This organization and its system split the American graphology world in two. Students had to choose between graphoanalysis or holistic graphology. While hard data is lacking, anecdotal accounts indicate that 10% of the members of International Graphoanalysis Society (IGAS) were expelled between 1970 and 1980.

Regarding a proposed correlation between biological sex and handwriting style, a paper published by James Hartley in 1989 concluded that there was some evidence in support of this hypothesis.

Rowan Bayne, a British psychologist who has written several studies on graphology, summarized his view of the appeal of graphology: "[I]t's very seductive because at a very crude level someone who is neat and well behaved tends to have neat handwriting", adding that the practice is "useless... absolutely hopeless". The British Psychological Society ranks graphology alongside astrology, giving them both "zero validity".

Graphology was also dismissed as a pseudoscience by the skeptic James Randi in 1991.

In his May 21, 2013 Skeptoid podcast episode titled "All About Graphology", scientific skeptic author Brian Dunning reports:

In his book The Write Stuff, Barry Beyerstein summarized the work of Geoffrey Dean, who performed probably the most extensive literature survey of graphology ever done. Dean did a meta-analysis on some 200 studies:

Dean showed that graphologists have unequivocally failed to demonstrate any validity or reliability of their art for predicting work performance, aptitudes, or personality. Graphology thus fails according to the standards which a genuine psychological test must pass before it can ethically be released for use on the public.

Dean found that no particular school of graphology fared better than any other. In fact, no graphologist of any kind was able to show reliably better performance than untrained amateurs making guesses from the same materials. In the vast majority of studies, neither group exceeded chance expectancy.

Dunning concludes:

Other non-scientific techniques like iridology, phrenology, palmistry, and astrology also have differing schools of thought, require years of training, offer expensive certifications, and fail just as soundly when put to a scientific controlled test. Handwriting analysis does have its plausible-sounding separation from those other techniques though, and that's the whole "handwriting is brainwriting" idea — traits from the brain will be manifested in the way that it controls the muscles of the hand. Unfortunately, this is just as unscientific as the others. No amount of sciencey sounding language can make up for a technique failing when put to a scientifically controlled test.

== Use by employers ==
Although graphology had some support in the scientific community before the mid-twentieth century, more recent research rejects the validity of graphology as a tool to assess personality and job performance. Today it is considered a pseudoscience. Many studies have been conducted to assess its effectiveness to predict personality and job performance. Recent studies testing the validity of using handwriting for predicting personality traits and job performance have been consistently negative.

Measures of job performance appear similarly unrelated to the handwriting metrics of graphologists. Professional graphologists using handwriting analysis were just as ineffective as lay people at predicting performance in a 1989 study. A broad literature screen by King and Koehler confirmed that dozens of studies showing the geometric aspects of graphology (slant, slope, etc.) are essentially worthless as predictors of job performance.

=== Additional specific objections ===
- The Barnum effect (the tendency to interpret vague statements as specifically meaningful) and the Dr. Fox effect (the tendency for supposed experts to be validated based on likeability rather than actual skill) make it difficult to validate methods of personality testing. These phenomena describe the observation that individuals will give high accuracy ratings to descriptions of their personality that supposedly are tailored specifically for them, but are in fact vague and general enough to apply to a wide range of people. See, for example, Tallent (1958). Non-individualized graphological reports give credence to this criticism.
- Effect Size: Dean's (1992) primary argument against the use of graphology is that the effect size is too small. Regardless of the validity of handwriting analysis, the research results imply that it is not applicable for any specific individual, but may be applicable to a group.
- Vagueness: Some important principles of graphology are vague enough to allow significant room for a graphologist to skew interpretations to suit a subject or preconceived conclusion. For example, one of the main concepts in the theory of Ludwig Klages is form-niveau (or form-level): the overall level of originality, beauty, harmony, style, etc. of a person's handwriting—a quality that, according to Klages, can be perceived but not measured. According to this theory, the same sign has a positive or negative meaning depending on the subject's overall character and personality as revealed by the form-niveau. In practice, this can lead the graphologist to interpret signs positively or negatively depending on whether the subject has high or low social status.

== Systems ==
Integrative graphology focuses on the strokes and their purported relation to personality. Graphoanalysis was the most influential system in the United States between 1929 and 2000.

Holistic graphology is based on form, movement, and use of space. It uses psychograms to analyze handwriting.

Four academic institutions offer an accredited degree in handwriting analysis:

- The University of Urbino, Italy: MA (Graphology)
- Instituto Superior Emerson, Buenos Aires, Argentina: BA (Graphology)
- Centro de Estudios Superiores (CES), Buenos Aires, Argentina: BA (Graphology)
- Autonomous University of Barcelona, Barcelona, Spain: MA (Graphology)

== Vocabulary ==
Every system of handwriting analysis has its own vocabulary. Even though two or more systems may share the same words, the meanings of those words may be different. The meanings of words to describe graphological observations used by handwriting analysts are not congruent. Resentment, for example, in common usage, means annoyance. In graphoanalysis, the term indicates a fear of imposition.

== Legal considerations ==
=== Hungary ===
A report by the Hungarian Parliamentary Commissioner for Data Protection and Freedom of Information says that handwriting analysis without informed consent is a privacy violation.

=== United States ===
==== Employment law ====
A 2001 advisory opinion letter from the U.S. Equal Employment Opportunity Commission responded to a question regarding "whether it is legal to use an analysis of an applicant's handwriting as an employment screening tool. You also ask whether it is legal to ask the applicant's age and use of medications to allow for variants in his/her handwriting." The letter advised that in this circumstance, it was illegal under the Americans with Disabilities Act of 1990 (ADA) to ask a job applicant whether they are taking any medications, and also advised that asking an applicant for their age "allegedly to allow for variants in analyzing his/her handwriting" was not a per se violation of the Age Discrimination in Employment Act of 1967 (ADEA), but could be significant evidence of age discrimination. The letter also said that there was no judicial guidance on "whether a policy of excluding applicants based upon their handwriting has an adverse impact on a protected group" under the ADA, ADEA, or Title VII of the Civil Rights Act of 1964.

== Applications ==
=== Gender and handwriting ===
A 1991 review of the then-current literature concluded that respondents were able to predict the gender of handwriting between 57 and 78% of the time. However, most of these samples, as well as subsequent studies, are based on small sample sizes that are collected non-randomly. A much larger and more recent survey of over 3,000 participants only found a classification accuracy of 54%. As statistical discrimination below 0.7 is generally considered unacceptable, this indicates that most results are rather inaccurate, and that variation in results observed is likely due to sampling technique and bias.

The reason for this bias varies; hypotheses are that biology contributes due to average differences in fine motor skills among males and females, and that differences arise from culture and gender bias.

=== Employment profiling ===
A company takes a writing sample provided by an applicant, and does a personality profile, supposedly matching the congruence of the applicant with the ideal psychological profile of employees in the position. The applicant can also malpractice in this system; they may ask someone to write on their behalf.

A graphological report is meant to be used in conjunction with other tools, such as comprehensive background checks, practical demonstration or record of work skills. Graphology supporters state that it can complement but not replace traditional hiring tools.

Research in employment suitability has ranged from complete failure to guarded success. The most substantial reason for not using handwriting analysis in the employment process is the absence of evidence of a direct link between handwriting analysis and various measures of job performance.

The use of graphology in the hiring process has been criticized on ethical and legal grounds in the United States.

=== Psychological analysis ===
Graphology has been used clinically by counselors and psychotherapists. When it is used, it is generally used alongside other projective personality assessment tools, and not in isolation. It is often used within individual psychotherapy, marital counseling, or vocational counseling.

=== Marital compatibility ===
In its simplest form only sexual expression and sexual response are examined. At its most complex, every aspect of an individual is examined for how it affects the other individual(s) within the relationship. The theory is that after knowing and understanding how each individual in the relationship differs from every other individual in the relationship, the resulting marriage will be more enduring. With a comparative analysis receiving and non-receiving parts responses are measured.

=== Medical diagnosis ===
Medical graphology is probably the most controversial branch of handwriting analysis. Strictly speaking, such research is not graphology as described throughout this article but an examination of factors pertaining to motor control. Research studies have been conducted in which a detailed examination of handwriting factors, particularly timing, fluidity, and consistency of size, form, speed, and pressure are considered in the process of evaluating patients and their response to pharmacological therapeutic agents. The study of these phenomena is a by-product of researchers investigating motor control processes and the interaction of nervous, anatomical, and biomechanical systems of the body.

The Vanguard Code of Ethical Practice, amongst others, prohibits medical diagnosis by those not licensed to do diagnosis in the state in which they practice.

=== Graphotherapy ===
Graphotherapy is the pseudoscience of changing a person's handwriting with the goal of changing features of their personality, or "handwriting analysis in reverse." It originated in France during the 1930s, spreading to the United States in the late 1950s. The purported therapy consists of a series of exercises similar to those taught in basic calligraphy courses, sometimes in conjunction with music or positive self-talk.

== See also ==
- Literomancy
- Numerology
- Physiognomy

=== Graphologists ===
- Max Pulver
- Robert Saudek
- Rafael Schermann
- Léopold Szondi
- Sheila Lowe

=== Related fields ===
- Asemic writing
- List of topics characterized as pseudoscience
- Palaeography
- Graphonomics
- Doodle
