= Jean-Hippolyte Michon =

French priest, an archaeologist, and the founder of graphology

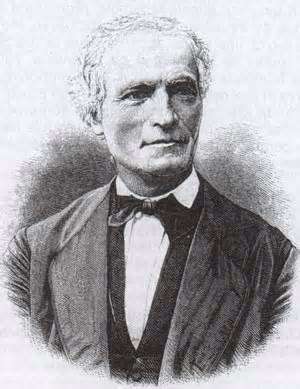
- Born: 21 November 1806; Laroche-près-Feyt, France
- Died: 8 May 1881 (aged 74)
- Occupations: priest and archaeologist

Academic work
- Discipline: graphology history
- Notable works: La Rénovation de l'Eglise; Les mystères de l'écriture Système de graphologie Méthode pratique de graphologie

Jean-Hippolyte Michon (21 November 1806 – 8 May 1881) was a French priest, an archaeologist, and the founder of graphology.

Born in Laroche-près-Feyt, department of Corrèze, he studied in Angoulême and at the seminary in Église Saint-Sulpice, Paris, where in 1830 he was ordained into the priesthood. In the 1830s, he first was introduced to the idea that a person's character could be ascertained via their handwriting from Abbé Flandrin (1804–1864), a priest who taught classes in philosophy.

In 1842, he resigned his position as a priest, though still remaining a preacher. He focused his energy towards scientific pursuits, in particular historical and archaeological research, publishing a number of works on the religious history of Charente. In 1844, he published a treatise on Gallo-Roman monuments of Charente titled Statistique Monumentale de la Charente. In 1850 he participated in an archaeological mission to the Middle East as an archaeologist and botanist.

In 1860 he published La Rénovation de l'Eglise (On the Renewal of the Church), in which he espoused his progressive thoughts on religion. This work was denounced by the Catholic Church and added to the Index Librorum Prohibitorum. Afterwards (1862–1869) he published, under a pseudonym, a series of anti-clerical novels.

In 1868 he made the acquaintanceship of chirologist Adolphe Desbarrolles, who along with Michon, had an interest in handwriting analysis. The two men decided to combine efforts towards writing a book on the subject, and despite Michon's opposition to Desbarrolles' occultistic view of handwriting analysis, the work was finally released in 1872 as Les mystères de l'écriture.

On 18 November 1871, Michon published the first issue of Le Journal des Autographes, a journal in which the term "graphology" is first used to describe handwriting analysis. Subsequently, he traveled throughout France and to other European cities, giving lectures and promoting his theories of scientific graphology. In the 1870s, he published Système de graphologie (1875), a book introducing Michon's system of handwriting signs, and Méthode pratique de graphologie (1878), in which he explains the principles of graphological analysis.
