= Sociometry =

Quantitative method for measuring social relationships

Sociometry is a quantitative method for measuring social relationships. It was developed by psychotherapist Jacob L. Moreno and Helen Hall Jennings in their studies of the relationship between social structures and psychological well-being, and used during Remedial Teaching.

== Definition ==
The term sociometry relates to its Latin etymology, socius meaning companion, and metrum meaning measure. Jacob Moreno defined sociometry as "the inquiry into the evolution and organization of groups and the position of individuals within them." He goes on to write "As the ...science of group organization, it attacks the problem not from the outer structure of the group, the group surface, but from the inner structure". "Sociometric explorations reveal the hidden structures that give a group its form: the alliances, the subgroups, the hidden beliefs, the forbidden agendas, the ideological agreements, the "stars" of the show."

Moreno developed sociometry as one of the newly developing social sciences. He states: "The chief methodological task of sociometry has been the revision of the experimental method so that it can be applied effectively to social phenomena." (Moreno, 2012:39)

The practice of the method had the focus on the outcomes established by the participants: "By making choices based on criteria, overt and energetic, Moreno hoped that individuals would be more spontaneous, and organisations and groups structures would become fresh, clear and lively."

One of Moreno's innovations in sociometry was the development of the sociogram, a graph that represents individuals as points/nodes and the relationships between them as lines/arcs. Moreno, who wrote extensively of his thinking, applications and findings, also founded a journal entitled Sociometry.

Moreno's sociograms

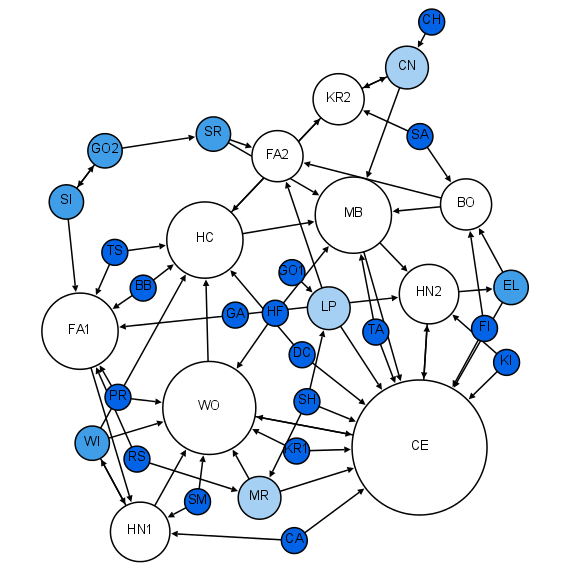
1st Grade

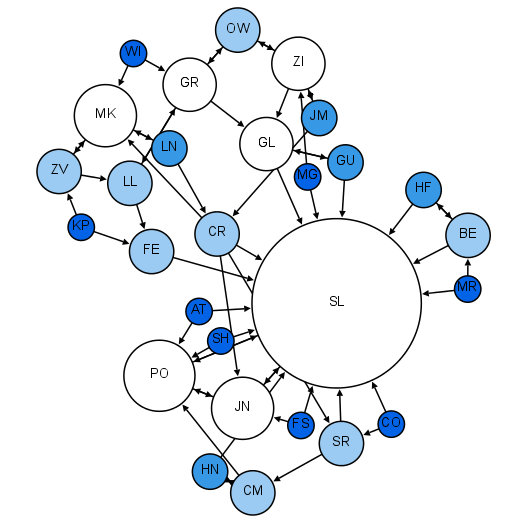
2nd Grade

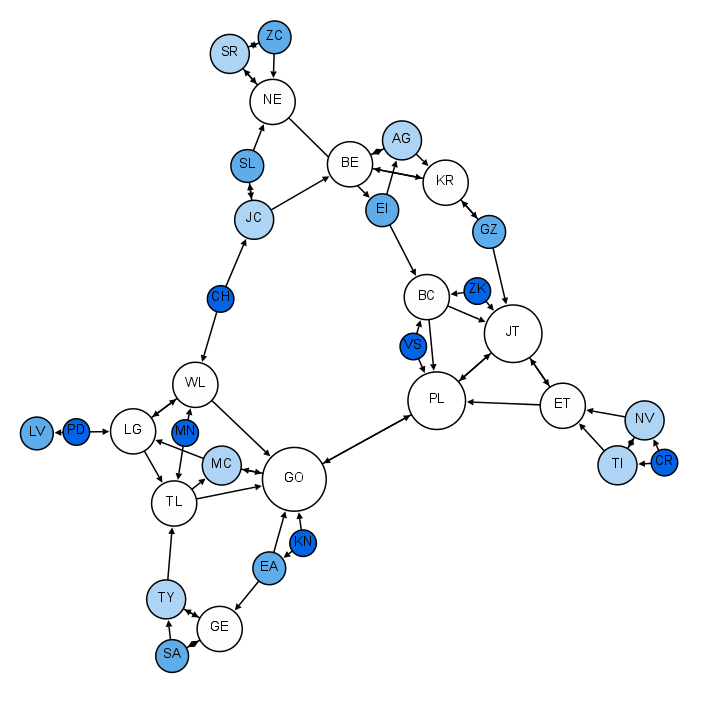
3rd Grade

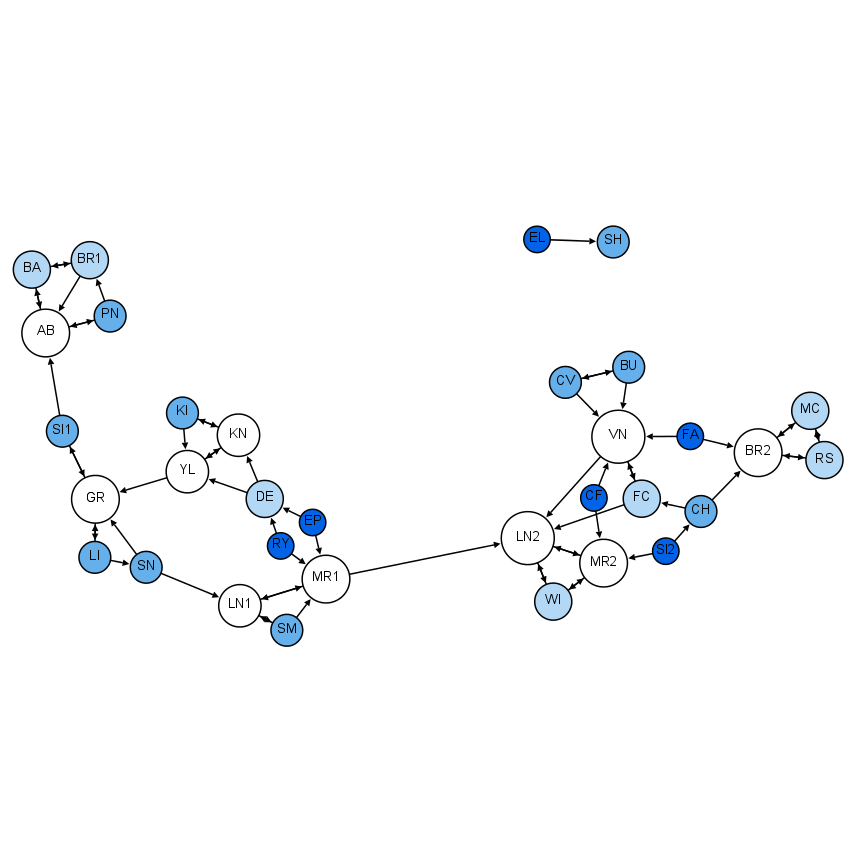
4th Grade

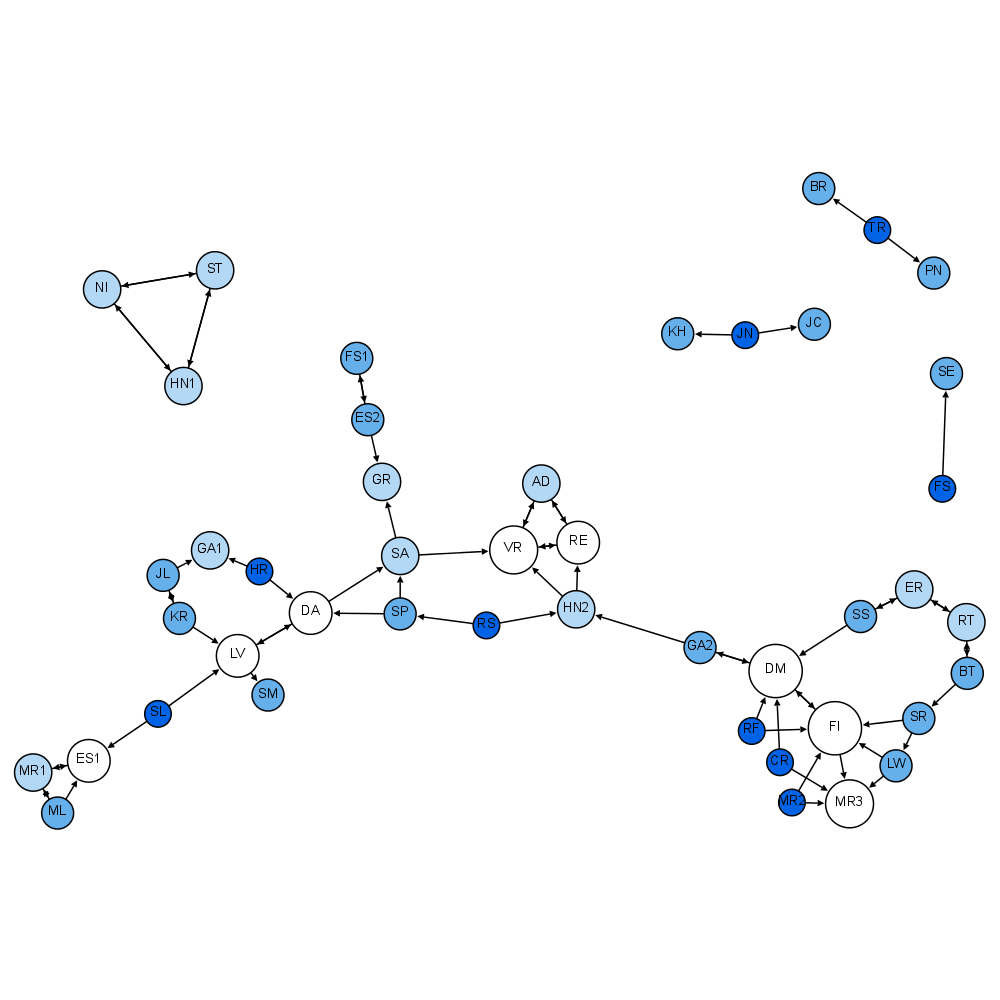
5th Grade

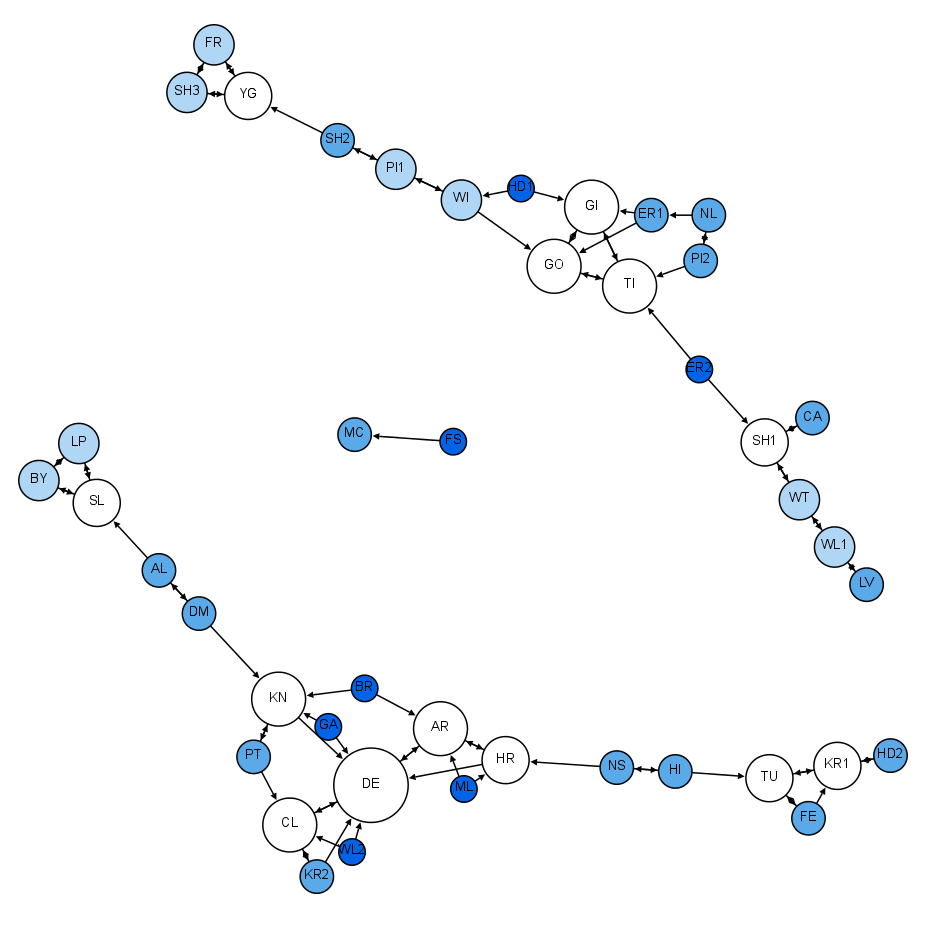
6th Grade

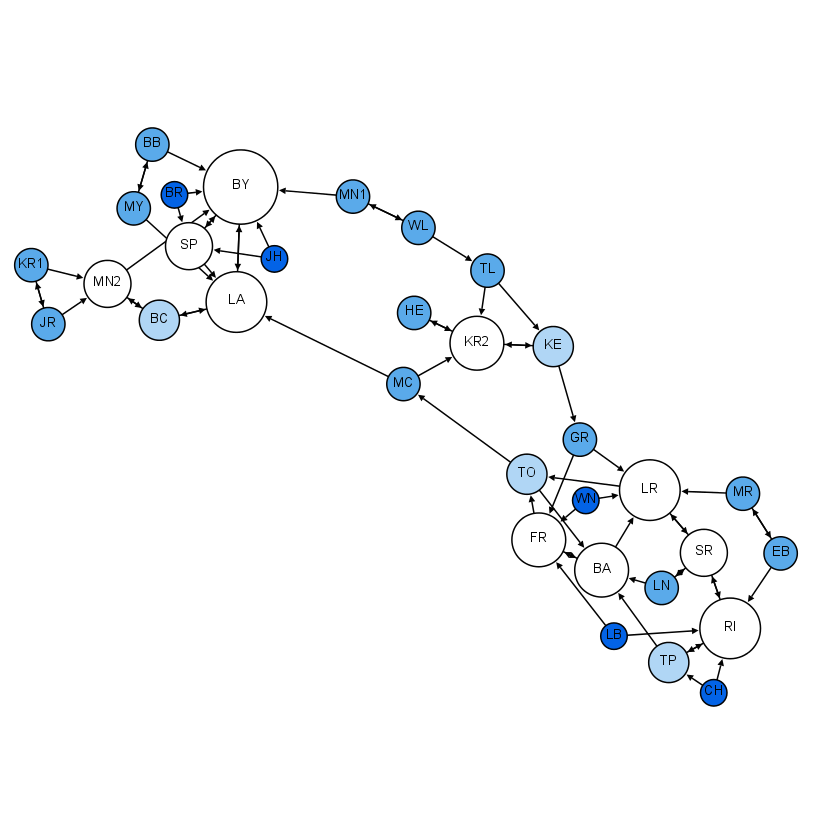
7th Grade

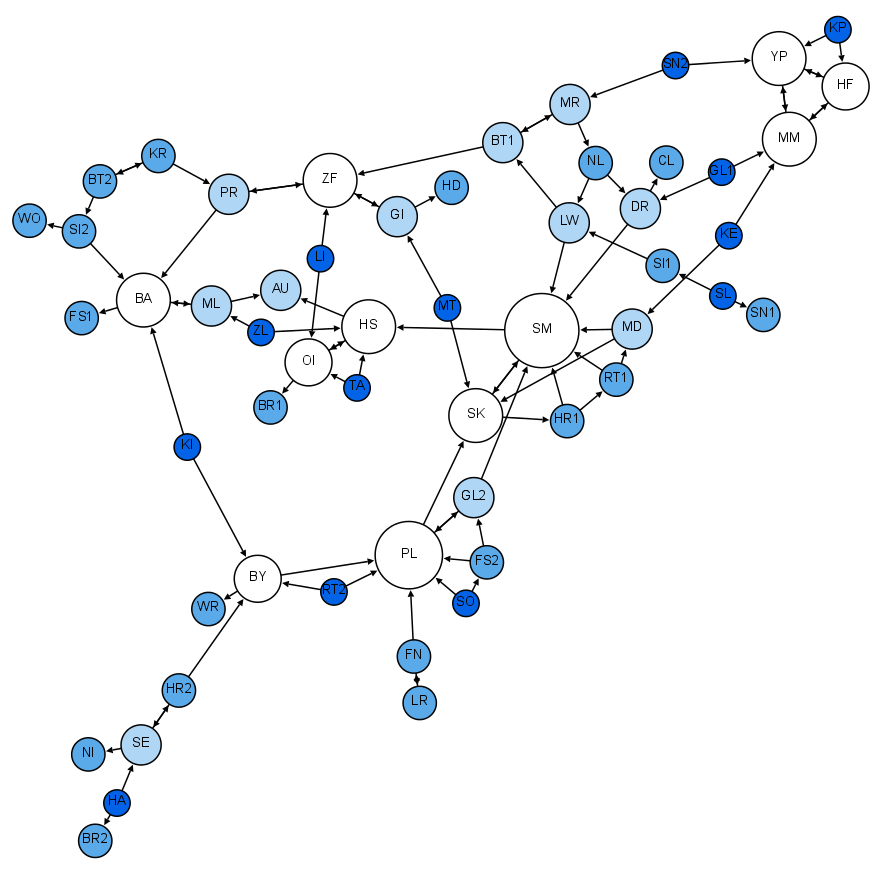
8th Grade

Within sociology, sociometry has two main branches: research sociometry, and applied sociometry. Research sociometry is action research with groups exploring the socio-emotional networks of relationships using specified criteria e.g. Who in this group do you want to sit beside you at work? Who in the group do you go to for advice on a work problem? Who in the group do you see providing satisfying leadership in the pending project? Sometimes called network explorations, research sociometry is concerned with relational patterns in small (individual and small group) and larger populations, such as organizations and neighborhoods. Applied sociometrists utilize a range of methods to assist people and groups in reviewing, expanding, and developing their existing psychosocial networks of relationships. Both fields of sociometry exist to produce through their application, greater spontaneity and creativity of both individuals and groups.

== Moreno's criteria for sociometric tests ==
In Sociometry, Experimental Method and the Science of Society: An Approach to a New Political Orientation (1951), Moreno describes the depth to which a group needs to go for the method to be "sociometric". The term for him had a qualitative meaning and did not apply unless some group process criteria were met. One of these is that there is acknowledgment of the difference between process dynamics and the manifest content. To quote Moreno: "there is a deep discrepancy between the official and the secret behavior of members". Moreno advocates that before any "social program" can be proposed, the sociometrist has to "take into account the actual constitution of the group."

Other criteria include the rule of adequate motivation: "Every participant should feel about the experiment that it is in his (or her) own cause ... that it is an opportunity for him (or her) to become an active agent in matters concerning his (or her) life situation." and the Rule of "gradual" inclusion of all extraneous criteria.

== Anthropological applications ==
Given that sociometry is concerned with group allegiances and cleavages, it is not surprising that sociometric methods have been used to study ethnic relationships and way individuals identify with ethnic groups. For instance, using sociometric research, Joan Criswell investigated white-black relationships in US classrooms, Gabriel Weimann researched ethnic relationships in Israel, and James Page has investigated intra-ethnic and inter-ethnic identification within the Pacific.

== Other approaches and software ==
Other approaches were developed in last decades, such as social network analysis, or sociomapping. Freeware as well as commercial software was developed for analysis of groups and their structure. All these approaches share much of their basic principles with Sociometry. Facebook is a social network service and website which is largely based on the sociometry of its users.

== See also ==
- Psychodrama
- Psychometrics
- Social interaction
- Social status
- Sociometric Solutions
- Socionics
