= Psychogram =

Psychogram is a term sometimes used in fields within psychology such as personality theory and perception as well as graphology and handwriting analysis, although the term has multiple senses, many of them outdated, and none of the senses of the term are defined clearly or used consistently.

One sense of the term is from psychological research in the middle of the twentieth century, meaning a composite psychological measurement which attempts to integrate various elements of a person's thought processes, often a diagram, usually in the form of a circle. According to one source, in this sense, a psychogram denoted "not the sum of elements but their interrelationship" as a way to reduce "complex happenings to a simple design which enables the individual to make his decision." The term was used by a few psychologists such as Daniel S. Anthony in the 1960s, PMID 13659290 It was used as a visual representation or "map" of an individual's personality. The term never caught on within the mainstream psychological academic establishment, possibly because there was no consistent sense of what psychograms were or how they should be used. There is a different, yet slightly related sense of the term, which refers to a specific system of handwriting analysis in the field of graphology. A third sense of the term has less emphasis on measuring personality and more on measuring psychological perception, with the term being used in conjunction with the Rorschach inkblot projection technique, so that the scores on various measures following a Rorschach test are combined into a summary of all the scored responses, called a psychogram. There are other senses which appear sporadically and which are not used consistently. For example, the term has been used in a few book titles; the psychology department of Illinois State University used the term as the title of a newsletter; it was used to describe a type of poetry. The term appeared briefly in 1896 in connection with early vision experiments regarding perception.
