= Sociomapping =

Method for processing data

Sociomapping is a method developed for processing and visualization of relational data (e.g. social network data). It is most commonly used for mapping the social structure within small teams (10-25 people). Sociomapping uses the landscape metaphor to display complex multi-dimensional data in a 3D map, where individual objects are localized in such way that their distance on the map corresponds to their distance in the underlying data.

Sociomapping utilizes visual coding in order to improve ease of interpreting complex data.

== History ==
The sociomapping method was developed in 1993–1994 by R. Bahbouh as a tool that would facilitate understanding of data about social relations and help preventing conflicts within teams of military professionals. The first major application of sociomapping took place in 1994–1995 during the HUBES experiment (Human Behavior in Extended Spaceflight) – a 135-day-long simulation of a spaceflight with three crew members organized by European Space Agency. Sociomapping was then regularly used in other spaceflight simulations (1995–1996: EKOPSY, 1999: Mars105, 2010–2012: Mars500). Since 2005, sociomapping has been extensively used in business environment to analyze relationships within senior management teams. In 2012, C. Höschl jr. developed Real Time Sociomapping^{®} software that enables instant visualization of the team dynamics and monitoring of the teams and social groups over time.

== Basic principle ==
The basic principle of Sociomapping is transforming original data concerning a set of objects in such a way that the distance of each pair of objects on the map corresponds to the distance between the two objects in the underlying data. Transformation of the data is a matter of 1) choosing some metric that could be reasonably interpreted as distance, and 2) translating the multi-dimensional distance matrix into 2D coordinate system so that the correlation between map-distances and data-distances is maximized.

The algorithm for data-transformation, developed by C. Höschl jr., is a dimensionality-reduction technique, such as PCA, and its goodness of fit can be measured by Spearman correlation between the map-distances and data-distances.

Sociomapping takes into account that, particularly in case of social relations, relational data may be asymmetrical (e.g. John likes Mary more than she likes him) and preserves this information by mapping the objects in such a way that for each object the closest other object is the one closest to it according to the metric of choice in the underlying data, and so on for other objects ordered by distance.

== Application ==
There are two main areas of application for Sociomapping – groups (small systems) and populations (large systems). For each area a different method of visualization and data transformation is used in order to facilitate people’s ability to understand and interpret the analyzed data.

=== Groups and small systems ===
Sociomapping for small systems produces Sociomaps of subjects. These subjects (in most cases people) are placed on the Sociomap reflecting their distance measured in various ways:

- social distance
- psychological distance (psychological similarity)
- communication distance
- other relation measures

Besides the distances between the group members, Sociomap shows additional variables coded in the height (or color) of the subject. Typical variables used for the height are: social status, performance indicators of the subjects, average communication frequency, etc.

Understanding the relative distances between the people helps to understand the structure of the group, find subgroups formed by group members and discover functions of the group members. In connection to the height Sociomap enables complex and comprehensive insight into the groups and small systems. This is particularly beneficial for workplace strategists.

Sociomapping of small systems produces similar results to social network analysis with additional visualization features.

=== Profile analysis ===
Besides the small systems analysis based on various relational data, Sociomapping can be used to visualize the profiles of unrelated subjects. This is done by transformation of subjects' profiles, computing the distances between the profiles and visualizing them in a Sociomap.

There is a software to compute Profile analysis (see section Sociomapping software).

=== Populations and large systems ===
For large systems and populations, different types of Sociomaps is used. Data used for these types of maps are rectangular matrices, where for each subject there is a preference vector of selected objects (such as political parties, brands, products, and so on). In order to create a Sociomap, for each subject a position in the map is determined, and a small piece of mass representing this subject is placed on the map according to its vector of preferences to an object. As a result, there are places on the Sociomap where more subject are placed (hills) and where there are no subject (valleys). Therefore, hills are formed on the places representing typical preference configurations and this allows for visual cluster analysis, or segmentation. In this sense, Large systems Sociomapping is a data mining approach based on visual pattern recognition).

Typical uses for Large systems Sociomapping are:

- political research (preferences and polls)
- marketing research (attitudes and product preferences)
- customer segmentation (behavioral patterns)
- and other research concerned with preferences and/or attitudes.

== Broader scope of application ==
Sociomapping has broader scope of application, including the following fields:

- Historical events analysis (e.g. RMS Titanic survival rate)
- Internet community tools (e.g. Last.fm profile similarity)
- Literature analysis (e.g. analysis of communication in Shakespeare plays)
- Military units and human spaceflight crews analysis
- Sport analysis and forecast (e.g. cooperation of sport teams)
- Politics analysis and forecast
- Team building
- Team analysis (communication, cooperation, decision-making)
- Leadership development
- Team collaboration – remote collaboration or hybrid teams
- Prevention of socio-pathological behavior among children at schools

== Software ==
So far only one software tool based on Sociomapping was released.

Team profile analyzer is a tool for psychologists, consultants, managers and HR specialists. It enables integration of various sources of information about team from personality, performance or knowledge tests and biographical data. It can be used for team analysis and development: team coaching, team building, recruitment etc.

== See also ==
- Participatory rural appraisal
- High-performance teams
- Human resources
- Marketing research
- Sociometry
- Team management
